This article is a description of the grammar of standardized Has Hlai, a Hlai language spoken on the island of Hainan, China by the Hlai (Li) ethnic group. The parts of speech are nouns, verbs, adjectives, conjunctions, numerals, adverbs, and pronouns.

Introduction 
The Hlai people (or, as they are called in Chinese, the Li – 黎族) are the original inhabitants of southern Hainan. A Kra–Dai people, they are believed to have settled there at least 2,000 to 6,000 years ago, and carry genetic markers from ancient people who reached the island between 7,000 and 27,000 years ago. The Pre-Hlai language they spoke would later evolve into Proto-Hlai, and from there into the modern Hlai languages.

In June 1956, China's government implemented research on Hainan Island of the Hlai people's language.

A 1983 report, Liyu diaocha yanjiu (黎语调查研究), claimed that the Hlai language is made up of five languages: Has 侾黎, Gheis 杞黎, Hyuuen 本地黎, Moeifou 美孚黎, and Deitou 加茂黎. For education, the Lauxhuet dialect of Has in Ledong Baoyou Baoding was chosen to be the Li's standardized language. It was this Language from which the "Li orthography" was developed.

In September 1984, two organizations, Central University for Nationalities and the Institute of Minorities in Chinese Academy of Social Sciences, made some revisions to the Li orthography. The Hlai language's orthography was finalized with the publishing of a textbook entitled Basic Li Course (Pinyin: Liyu Jichu Jiaocheng; Chinese: 黎语基础教程).

At the end of 2019, a Hlai-language dictionary was officially posted online (http://www.tunhlai.com).

Phonology and Orthography

Consonants 
Has Hlai has 31 consonants. /ȶ/ is only found as a coda.

Notes:

 /ʔ/ is a null initial
 /ʔw/ and /ʔj/ are glottalized
The velar stops are allophonic in Has Hlai with fricative forms (/k/ > /x/, etc)
/f/, /v/ are labiodental; /m/, /b/, /p/, /pʰ/, and /pl/ are bilabial

Vowel rimes

Tones 
Has Hlai has 3 tones. Each tone can take two forms, depending on whether the syllable ends in a stop ("tonic tone") or not ("level tone").

Grammar

Nouns

Common nouns

Related to mankind/person 

 【baiskaux】: (1) woman; (2) wife, it is only used by a husband to call his own wife; it is an impolite word to use to call others' wives.
 【pasmaen】: (1) man; (2) husband, it is only used by a wife to call her own husband; it is an impolite word to use to call others' husbands.
 【baisdza】: mother,  it is used by a narrator. When a child calls his/her own mother, he/she uses the word "bais"
 【pasdza】: (1) father,  it is used by a narrator. When a child calls his/her own father, he/she uses the word "pas"; (2) a respected way to call an elderly man.

Related to objects/things

 【ghang】: hill, mountain
 【noms/nams】: (1) water; (2) river
 【laengs】: sea
 【fei】: (1) n.: fire; (2) v.: walk
 【ghei】: rice

Related to time or space

 【hwanneix】: today;【uuhaux】: tomorrow
 【paisdeuu】: up;【paisfou】: down; 【paiskueng】: right;【paishluums】: left

Proper nouns

People

 Han (Chinese) name: All Li's Chinese names are loan words, borrowed from the Hainanese spoken language in the region called Uislius (黄流), e.g., (Mao Zedong (毛泽东), the founder of the People's Republic of China.
 Hlai name: The Li people usually call their children with names from their own language (Hlai).

Group/organization/party
 These are loan words from Hainanese, e.g.,  (中国共产党), Chinese Communist Party.

Places

 These are loan words from Hainanese, e.g., Bhakgengs, "Beijing, 北京 (capital of the People's Republic of China)"; Haeisnaems dhaeus, "Hainan Island, 海海南岛"; Lokdhongs,  "Ledong, 乐东 (the central city of the tribe of Has Hlai )"

Nations

 Most are loan words from Hainanese, e.g., Dangx Gok, "China, 中国";
 few are not loan words, e.g., Moei, "Han people, 汉族"; Hlai, "Li people, 黎族"

Abstract nouns  
These nouns are mostly loan words. The Hlai language being both practical and concrete in nature, is not suitable for describing anything intangible.

The basic rules for Nouns in Hlai language

1. Nouns usually cannot be modified by number alone; the number needs a proper classifier following the number to modify the noun.
zuu lang dzax, (a/one  classifier  snake) "a snake"

But, nouns associated with dates (like year, month, day), are modified with numbers alone (no classifiers).

fus boux (three year) "three years"
hlaus  hwan (two day) "two days"
ba nyaen (five month) "May"

When the word "nyaen" refers to the name of a month (as May above), a number can modify "nyaen" without a classifier. However, when the word "nyaen" refers to the number of months (as below), a classifier is required to modify the word "nyaen."

ba hom nyaen (five  classifier  month) "five months"

2. Nouns cannot be modified by adverbs, nor can a noun be doubled (e.g., **uxaeu uxaeu, "man man"; **blongs blongs, "house house") to express the meaning of "every" as is done in Chinese. The way to present the meaning of "every" is to use the word "ranx" plus a proper classifier as below:

ranx    zuen        uxaeu (every classifier  man/one) "everyone"
ranx    hom         blongs (every classifier  house) "every house"

3. Although the Hlai language does not have declension of gender, it does have two prefixes to indicate the gender: "bais" for female and "pas" for male, e.g.

pasdza, "father"
baisdza, "mother"
paskai, "cock/rooster"（kai: chicken）
baiskai, "hen"
pasdzuengsgong, "salesman" （dzuengs: sale, gong: stuff）
baisdzuengsgong, "saleswoman"

When the word "bais" exists alone, the meaning is mother; "pas" means father. "Pas" could also be used as a classifier, e.g.,

Kun hluuekmuuen  hauux  zuu  pas lax  zuu  hom. (Plural_marker  young_man     those  one   classifier  eat  one  classifier) "Each of those young men ate one."

4.The Hlai language does not use suffixes or prefixes for nouns to denote plurality as in the English language. But, the Hlai language uses the word "kun" to indicate the plurality of nouns, e.g.

Kun aeudza rien tun raeu dhuus  fou cai.  (Plural_marker old_man say/talk/speak word laugh in under  tree) "The old men were telling jokes under the tree."

The word "kun" can also be used together with a number and a classifier to modify nouns, e.g.,

Kun hlaus  zuen  kauus fuuek   riens paens. (Plural_marker  two classifier  older_sister  weave  skirt decorative_pattern) "The two older sisters were weaving skirts with a decorative pattern."

5. A noun can be a subject, predicate, object, e.g.

("cai" as subject and "ceeng" as object)

cai tuuen ceeng (Tree out_of flower) "trees bloom (flowers)"

("veengs" as subject and "veengs" as predicate)

Veengs    hauux  veengs     meuu. (shirt/top  that shirt/top you (sg.)) "That shirt/top is yours."

6. A noun can be an attribute, and also can be modified by attributes e.g.
Meuu kweis ojiep  caqias  Hlai da? (You want learn script Li ) "Do you want to learn Hlai script?"

7.  A noun can also be an adverbial modifier, e.g.
Tong neix cai vuek. (tong  this  tree/wood  do/make) "This hookah is made out of wood." (tong = An apparatus for smoking, such as a hookah)

8.    A noun in relation to time can even be an adverbial modifier to modify a verb, e.g.
Hwanneix   fous  dhat  lo! (Today hot very ) "It's so hot today!"
Na uunyeuu hei zok das. (He/she day_after_tomorrow go to/toward  mother's_mother) "He is going to grandma's house the day after tomorrow."
Fa   uupans     beuuluueng. (We  yesterday  come_ back) "We came back yesterday."

9.  When the word "guu" is placed before a noun to indicate subordination, this combination functions as a possessive phrase, and can only be in the predicate of the sentence, e.g.
Vabheny  neix guu Dongxgok. (Airplane   this  China) "This airplane belongs to China."
Hlaus  lang duis neix  guu Laufus. (Two classifier water_buffalo  this    Mr. Fu) "These two water buffaloes belong to Mr. Fu."

Verbs

Action verbs
 【vuek，做】: to do, make...(it is used frequently)
 【lax，吃】: (1) to eat, drink, smoke...; (2) to swallow up (it is used frequently)
 【duuengx，给】: to give
 【taeix，打】: to strike, hit
 【bleuu，听】: (1) to hear; (2) to feel
 【dzok，偷】: to steal
 【zongs，坐】: to sit
 【ghais，叫，请，派】: to tell someone(s) to do something; to invite...
 【fei，走】: (1) v.: to walk; (2) n.: fire
 【cuuek，休息】: to rest
 【tuas，欺骗】: to cheat
 【liengs，看守】:  to watch, to guard
 others

Linking verbs
 【man，是】: am, is, are (be verbs, sometimes omitted in the sentence)
 【ghwaix，不是】: am not, is not, are not

Verbs for expressing mental activities
 【dhas，怕】: to fear, to be afraid of
 【ngop，想念】: to long to see again, to miss
 【oep，爱】: to love, to like
 【vuuengx，心里烦乱】: confusing, disorderly (used as a verb)
 【luuemx，忘记】: to forget
 【uuen，埋怨】: to complain
 【tuuenngaen，生气】: to be angry (other similar word: kis, kisngaen)
 【dhaix，忍受】: to endure, to bear
 others

Verbs for expressing existence, change, development
 【dhuus，在】:(1) v.: to exist; (2) prep.: in, on, at
 【zaux，有】: to have, there is/are
 【hlaeux，死】: (1) v.: to die; (2) n.: death
 【hlou，生】: (1) v.: to give birth; (2) adj.: alive, living
 【long，长大】: (1) v.: to grow up; (2) adj.: big, large
 【dzauux，变】: to change
 others

Modal verbs
 【gieu，能】: to be good at, to be able to, can
 【gax，不能】: to be unable to, cannot
 【kweis，愿意】: to be willing to
 【ais，不愿】: to be not willing to
 【dheeng-hwoek，同意，愿意】: to agree with, to be willing to
 【kueng，会】: to know how to, to be able to
 【boei，不会】: to not know how to, to be unable to
 【loepp，可以，能够】: to be allowed to, to be able to
 【guulax，必须，应该】: must, should
 【kiemx，必须，应该】: must, should (this is a loan word)
 【komx，必须，应该】: must, should (this is a loan word)
 【auux，敢】: to dare to
 others

Verbs of motion
 【buuen，来】: to come
 【hei，去】: to go
 【beuu，回】: to go back to, to return
 【luueng，返】: to return
 【dhuas，过】: to pass through
 【kaen，上】: to go up
 【luei，下】: to go down
 【hluet，进】: to go into
 【tuuen，出】: (1) v.: to go out, to leave, to exit; (2) prep.: from
 【dhaens，到】: to arrive

The basic rules for Verbs in Hlai language

1.     In Hlai language, verbs never change their form. The placement of an adverb or an auxiliary word after or before a verb determines the verb's tense.

A.    Progressive aspect 
The adverbial word "faets" or "fietla" can express the action in process, and is placed before a verb, e.g.,

B.    Perfect aspect 
The verbs with the word "bhaeis" expresses an action that has already happened. If "bhaeis" is placed before a verb, it is an adverbial,e.g.,

Hluuek  na         bhaeis                                              hei  ang  he.

child     he/she  adverbial word of perfective aspect  go field  accent

"他的孩子已经去山栏地了，His children/child already went to the field."

Pashlaus       na         bhaeis                                               bleuu  fan    rien,

older brother  he/she  adverbial word of perfective aspect  hear   then  say

"Eis,      hluumsghweuu na          guu.                                  loms        cas da?"

Accent  don't know        he/she auxiliary of future aspect still/again or    not

"他哥哥（已经）听了便说，"哎，不知道他还要这样不?"，

When his brother heard of it, he said, "Oh, I don't know that he would still do that (or) not?"

If the word "bhaeis" is placed after a verb, it acts as a complement and means "finished", e.g.,

Hou  lax   tax bhaeis    goms  hei.

I        eat  rice finished  then    go

"我吃完饭就去，After I finish dinner, I'll go."

The word "dhuas" can also denote the perfect aspect, ("(1) v.: pass through; (2) an auxiliary word that indicates that an action has already happened, and is placed after the verb; (3) an auxiliary word that expresses a comparison, and is placed after the adjective") e.g.,

Meuu  laeis  zuu zuen         aeu                   neix  dhuas    cas  da?

you     see    one classifier  person/people  this  auxiliary  or    not

"你见过这个人吗？Have you ever seen this man?"

Dhes  da   rien            dhongneix  dhuas.

I         not  say/speak like this       auxiliary

"我没有说过这样的话，I didn't say anything like that."

C.    Future aspect 
The auxiliary word "kweis" or "guu" indicates that an action is in future by being placed before a verb, e.g.,

Na        kweis                               hei  Damxax.

he/she auxiliary word for future  go   Sanya city

"他要去三亚，He is going to Sanya."

Meuu  kweis                              vuek         meshes?

you     auxiliary word for future  do/make  what

"你要干什么？What will you do?"

The nuance between the two words "kweis" and "guu" is that: when two verbs are used together, if the first one is the method of the second one, or the second one is the purpose of the first one, only the word "guu" can be placed before the second verb, e.g.,

Bhoek  noms  guu                        roengx  tax.

carry    water  for the purpose of  cook    rice

"打水煮饭，bring the water (used) for cooking"

D.    Others 
If an action only lasts for a short while, the adverbial word "zuufanx" is placed after the verb, e.g.,

Gaux      zuufanx.

lie down  a short while

"躺一会儿，Liedown (for) a short while."

Duuengx        hou  cat      zuufanx.

to let/to allow  I,      wear  a short while

"给我穿一下子，Let me wear it (for) a short while."

2.    Hlai verbs, including action verbs, verbs for expressing mental activities, and verbs for expressing existence, change, and development, can be predicates or predicate heads in a sentence. Most of these verbs can be followed by objects or by complements, and can be modified by adverbials, nouns of time, and auxiliary words, e.g., 

Dhes  naeus  buuen.

I          just     come

"我刚来，I just came here."

Mieu gaenys diu.

cat    bite       mouse

"猫咬老鼠，A cat bites a mouse."

Pasdza  dhuus    blongs.

father    exist/in house

"父亲在家，Father is at home."

Meuu  uuhaux      kweis                              hei  da？

you    tomorrow  auxiliary word for future  go  not

"你明天去吗？Are you going tomorrow (or not)?"

3.    Hlai verbs, except for linking verbs, can usually be made nominal by adding a prefix "uu-"; nominal verbs can be a subject, but cannot be a major part of the predicate, e.g., 

Uu-     laix    hauux  dax hou.

prefix   plow  that    field  my

"那犁过的是我的田，The field that has been plowed is mine."

Uu-     buuen  hauux  ghueng                          dhes.

prefix  come   that      young brother or sister  my

"那个来的是我的弟弟（妹妹），The one who is coming is my brother/sister."

Nominal verbs still can function as a verb with an object following it; the nominal verb and the object together can function as a subject, object or nominal predicate, e.g.,

Duis     neix  man  uu-    duuengx  hlausghueng.

buffalo this   is      prefix give          relatives

"这牛是给亲戚的，The buffalo is for (giving to) the relatives."

Uu-     oep  hou man  dhangjis  hou.

prefix  love  me   is     comrade my

"爱我的是我的同志，The one who loves me is my comrade."

4.    Hlai verbs are rarely doubled as they are in Chinese; only monosyllabic action verbs and verbs for expressing mental activities can be doubled. Doubled monosyllabic verbs imply that the action is casually and carelessly done, e.g., 

Na       bleuu  bleuu  fan   beuu.

he/she  hear    hear  then  go back

"他听了听就回去了，He (only) heard about/of it and went back."

Kun                 hluuekueng  dzueis dzueis fan    fei     hluet    blongs.

plural marker  young girl     look     look    then  walk  go into house

"姑娘们看了看就走进屋里去了，The girls (only) taking a quick look, then went into the house."

A verb followed by "laeis" comes to mean "to try"; if a verb is followed by an object, the word "laeis" should be placed after the object, e.g.,

Hou  qim    laeis.

I        taste  try

"我尝尝看，I'll try (to taste) it."

Meuu      dzueis dhang  na        laeis.

You (s.)  look     face     he/she  try

"你看看他的脸，You try to look at his face."

5.    Modal verbs are usually placed before a verb forming the predicate of a sentence to express 1) the ability of the one performing the action, or 2) the possibility, obligation, or need of the action, e.g., 

Dhes  kueng         rien             tun     Moei.

I          know how  say/speak  word  Han/Chinese

"我会讲汉语，I can speak Chinese."

Meuu  kiemx            hei  geek       guns.

You     should/must  go   look for  firewood

"你应该去砍柴，You should look for firewood."

Meuu  guulax           dhongneix  vuek  naus dhiu.

you     should/must  like this       do     just    right

"你必须这样做才对，You must do (it) like this, (for it) to be done just right."

Meuu  gieu            vuek  meshes?

You     be good at  do     what

"你能干什么？What are you good at?"

Na        boei                 taeis   zuu hom         qias    neix.

he/she  be not able to write  one  classifier  script  this

"他不会写这个字，He does not know how to write this one script."

Hou  dheeng'hwoek       vuek.

I        be willing to/agree  do

"我愿意/同意做，I am willing to (do that) / I agree to (do that)."

Meuu  kweis            beuu   na        da?

You     be willing to marry  he/she  not

"你愿意嫁他吗？Are you willing to marry him?"

Na         ais                      vuek.

he/she  be not willing to  do

"他不愿意做，He is not willing to (do that)."

Na       gax               vuek  gong neix.

he/she  be not able  do     work  this

"他无法做这个工作，He is not able to do this work."

Na        loepp                                buuen.

he/she  be allowed to/be able to  come

"他可以来，He is able to come. / He is allowed to come."

Hou  auux      taeix hapaeu.

I        dare to      shoot

"我敢打枪，I dare to shoot."

Modal verbs cannot be followed by noun-objects, nor can modal verbs be doubled, except in an interrogative sentence, that a positive and negative modal verb is used to ask yes or no,e.g.,

Meuu  kueng        da   kueng?

You     know how  not know how

"你会不会？Do you know how to do it (or not)?"

Only in answering questions, can a modal verb act alone as a predicate, except for the modal verbs "kiemx", "guulax" and the word "guu", which cannot act as a predicate, e.g.,

Meuu  gieu           rien             tun    Hlai cas  da? Dhes  gieu.

You     be able to say/speak  word  Li    or    not? I        be able to

"你能说黎语吗？我能，Can you speak the Hlai/Li language? I can."

Modal verbs sometimescan be followed by an object, e.g.,

Na  bhaeis  o                          kueng        qias    Hlai  he.

he  already  learn (loan word)  know how script  Li     accent

"他已经学会黎文了，He already learned the Hlai's/Li's script."

The antonym of the modal verb "kweis" is "ais"; the antonym of "kueng" is "hluums", and that of "gieu" is "gax", which cannot be used in the imperative mood.

6.    Verbs of motion can act alone as a predicate, e.g., 

Uengxtoengs buuen  res!

everyone         come   accent

"大家来吧！Everyone, come!"

Also, verbs of motion can follow a main verb to express the direction of the action forming a predicate, e.g.,

Dhes  fei     hluet    blongs.

I         walk  go into house

"我走进屋里，I walked into the house."

Na       tuuen  blongs  ghoux tuuen   buuen.

he/she  from    house  run      go out  come

"他从屋里跑出来，He ran out of the house."

Zuufanx         blei    hei,      zuufanx          blei    luueng.

a short while  swim  go to, a short while  swim  go back

"一会儿游去，一会儿游回，swim back and forth."

Also, verbs of motion can combine together and become compound words as can be seen in the chart below:

 
The compound words above can be followed by objects, e.g.,

Hou  hwanneix  bhaeis   duengx      heikaen  hwous.

I        today        already carry/bring  go up     mountain

"我今天已经送到山上去，I have already brought (it) to the mountain today."

Pasdza   ghuis          na        heihluet  hwous     hloek.

"父亲带他进入深山，Father took him into the remote mountains."

Pasbhanghlauux fan    beuuluueng  blongs.

name of a man    then  come back   home

"Pasbhanghlauux 便回家去，Then, Pasbhanghlauux went home."

Except for the word "luueng", the words found in the first column of the chart ("dhuas", "kaen", "luei", "hluet", "tuuen", and "beuu") and the words found along the top row ("buuen", "hei", and "beuu") can exchange positions. After exchanging positions, the compound words cannot be followed by an object, and usually are used in imperative mood.

7.    Linking verbs are placed before nouns, noun phrases or pronouns, combining two grammatical parts as a predicate, to provide information about the objects, e.g., 

Hou  man  Hlai, ghwaix  Moei.

I        am    Li,    am not   Han/Chinese

"我是黎族，不是汉族，I am a Li, not a Han."

Na  man  pashlaus        hou.

He  is      older brother  my

"他是我的哥哥，He is my older brother."

The linking verbs can be omitted, e.g.,

Na pasghueng         hou.

He  younger brother  my

"他是我的弟弟，He is my younger brother."

But, when the subject or predicate is too long, or when the predicate includes numbers, the linking verbs cannot be omitted, e.g.,

Gha  uengxtoengs bhaeisbhaeis  ruus  man uxaeu   Dongxgok.

We    everyone        all                   all      are  people  China

"咱们大家都是中国人，All of us are Chinese."

Linking verbs cannot go with words that indicate the tense (like "faets" or "bhaeis" or "dhuas"), nor with directional verbs or with the complement, nor be modified by adverbials, or be doubled.

8.    When the suffix "toengs" is added to some verbs, the compound words become reciprocal verbs, and cannot be followed by any objects, e.g., 

Duis                tut'toengs.

Water buffalo  collide with each other

"牛互相碰撞，The buffaloes collided with each other."

Na         hlaus zuen         oeptoengs         dhat.

He/she  two     classifier love each other  truly

"他们两人很相爱，The two of them love each other very much."

9.    Some words in Hlai language are both nouns and verbs, e.g., 

In Chinese and English, the verb "wear" can apply to different actions, like wearing a necklace, wearing a hat, or wearing earrings. However, in Hlai language these different actions are distinguished by different verbs, e.g.,

 "to wear"
 kienx (for wearing a necklace);
 mieng (for wearing earrings);
 ngwaus (for wearing a hat);
 pien (for wearing a skirt, pants, shoes);
 cat (for wearing a top, a shirt)
 "noise"
 roeng (from an insect or bird);
 vuns (from a dog);
 hyoen (from a rooster);
 ngwaety (from a human)

Adjectives

Describing the characteristics of a person or thing 
 【hleny，好】: good
 【reek，坏】: bad, not good
 【kaeix，冷】: cold
 【fous/faus，热】: hot
 【dza，老】: old
 【bluuek，年轻】: young
 【hloek，深】: deep
 【tuuens，浅】: shallow
 others

Describing the forms/attributes of thing 
【long，大】: big, large
【enyx，小】: small
【peek，高】: tall, high
【tauus，矮】: short
【daeus，长】: long
【taty，短】: short
 others

Describing the state of actions or emotions 
 【dzuuns，快】: quick
 【dais，慢】: slow
 【hluengs，松】: loose
 【guung，紧】: tight
 【hlenyfaty，快乐】: happy
 【heen，容易】: easy
 others

The basic rules for Adjectives in Hlai language

1.     In Hlai language, adjectives cannot be a subject, nor an object, but can act as a predicate, attribute, adverbial, or complement.

A.    As a predicate 
The adjective goes after the subject, e.g.,

One  classifier  fruit    that     big/large  very much

"那一个果子很大，That fruit (is) large!"

Zuu  zuen        aeu               max   reek.

One  classifier  man/person there  bad

"那一个人坏，That man (is) bad/notorious."

B.   As an attribute 
The adjective goes after the noun that is modified, e.g.,

dhop  kieu

cloth  blue/green

"蓝布，(a) blue cloth"

veengs    paens

shirt/top  colorful

"花衣服，(a) loud (pronounced colors) shirt"

rain  big

"大雨，heavy rain"

hwous      enyx

mountain  small

"小山，(a) small mountain / hill"

blongs  peek

"高房子，(a) tall house"

ceeng  hleny

flower  good

"好花，(a) pretty flower"

C.   As an adverbial 
The adjective is placed before the verb, e.g.,

Meuu  dais  dais   lax  as.

You     slow  slow  eat  an accent

"你慢慢地吃吧！(You) Eat slowly."

Na         kauuspaeis      fei.

He/she  swift in action  walk

"他迅速地走，He walked quickly."

D.    As a complement 
The adjective usually comes after the verb in a sentence, e.g.,

Na         vuek       reek he.

He/she  do/make  bad  an accent

"他弄坏了，He has broken (it)."

Meuu  bhaeis  laix    hleny  hyos?

You     already  plow well    marker of question

"你已经犁好了吗？Have you finished plowing?"

2.    An adjective also can be modified by adverbs, which can be placed either before or after the adjective, e.g., 

da   hleny

not  good

"不好，not good"

da   peek

"不高，not tall"

vaeu  reek

most  bad

"最坏，worst"

duix  hlenymuuen

most  beautiful

"最美丽，most beautiful"

paens             dhatdhat

colorful/floral truly/really

"很花，very colorful"

hlenyfaty  baisias

happy       very much

"很高兴，very happy"

3.     In Hlai language, adjectives have comparative and superlative degrees.

A.    comparative degree 
Either "dhuas" or "bhi", denote comparative degree; the former one is a Hlai word, the latter a loan word. If the word "dhuas" is used, it should be placed after the adjective, and the adjective and "dhuas" should be placed between the two objects being compared, e.g.,

Baisdza  peek  dhuas         hluuekbaiskaux.

"母亲高过女儿，The mother is taller than her daughter."

Winter melon/white gourd   big    more than  pumpkin

"冬瓜大过南瓜，The white gourd is bigger than her pumpkin."

If the loan word "bhi" is used, it is placed between the two objects being compared, and the adjective is placed after the latter object, e.g.,

Meuu  bhi          dhes  peek.

"你比我高，You are taller than I (am)."

Blongs  dhes bhi           blongs  na hleny.

House    my    compare house   his  good

"我的房子比他的房子好，My house is better than his."

B.   superlative degree 
Either "vaeu" or "duix", denote superlative degree; the former one is a Hlai word, the latter a loan word. If either "vaeu" or "duix" is used, it should be placed before the adjective, e.g.,

Pashlaus         vaeu gieu.

Older brother most  capable

"哥哥最能干，The older brother is most capable."

Baiscuty                  duix  hlenymuuen.

Youngest daughter  most  beautiful

"幺妹最漂亮，The youngest daughter is most beautiful."

According to my Hlai language consultant, Mr. Liu, "The word veau could possibly imply a derogatory, an exaggerated or overstated statement." It depends on the context.

C.   Others 

"Zuugit", instead of indicating comparative or superlative degrees, denotes "(just) a little bit", e.g.,

Zuu  kuuengx  cai   neix  peek zuugit.

"这棵树高一点，This three is just a little bit taller."

Veengs    neix baen  zuugit.

shirt/top  this   new  a little bit

"这衣服新一点，This dress is just a little bit newer."

4.    Except for adjectives that describe a mental/emotional status, adjectives can be made nominal by adding the prefix "uu-". Adjectives that are nominal cannot be a predicate, but can act as a subject, an object, or an attribute, e.g., 

Uu-hleny          neix man  guu                                meuu.

The good one  this    is     a maker of possession  you

"这个好的是你的，This good one is yours."

Na         qieng     dheuu uu-daeus.

He/she  want to  take    the long one

"他想拿长的，He wants to take the long one."

Kai         uu-long        hauux man  guu                               dhes.

Chicken  the big one  that     is      a maker of possession  me

"那只大的鸡是我的，That big chicken is mine."

5.    Adjectives for describing the forms/attributes of things, and those for describing the status of actions or emotions, can be doubled, but the adjective has to be monosyllabic.When the adjectives are doubled, the degree of the adjective increases, e.g., 

veengs    kaeu kaeu

shirt/top  white  white

"白白的衣服，white clothes"

dzuuns  dzuuns buuen

quick      quick    come

"快快来，come quickly"

dais   dais   fei

slow  slow  walk

"慢慢走，walk slowly" (When the Hlai people are saying farewell (bye), "dais dais fei" is the phrase they say to each other.)

Two different adjectives can be doubled like AABB, e.g.,

Blongs  dhes baen  baen  hleny hleny.

House    my    new   new   good  good.

"我的房子又新又好，My house is new and good."

"这一座山又高又大，This mountain is tall and big."

Two different adjectives also can be positioned in an ABAB pattern, e.g.,

Guen  neix peek  tauus  peek  tauus.

"这条路高高低低，This road is rough/bumpy."

Na        fei      aus    uty       aus     uty.

He/she  walk  swing swing  swing  swing

"他踉踉跄跄地走着，He is walking tipsy (unsteady like a drunk)."

Zuu  dhaenx    guen   neix  muety   toei  muety    toei.

One  classifier  road  this   straight  flat  straight  flat

"这一条路平平直直，This road is straight and smooth."

Also, some monosyllabic adjectives express an increasing degree by the adding of a prefix, which combines the initial consonant of that adjective with a vowel like "i" or "u"; and the tone of the prefix is the first tone, e.g.,

li-        loek

prefix  dark

"黑漆漆，pitch-dark"

ri-       raeux

prefix  sparse

"稀疏，sparse"

gu-     goeks

prefix  concave

"黑漆漆，full of bumps and holes/uneven"

ghu-   ghaeu

prefix  clear

"清澈，clear"

6.    Some adjectives can have a duplicated suffix tagged on to the ends, which cannot exist independently, to intensify the description, e.g., 

kaeu- laepplaepp

white  something looks bright

"亮晶晶，something is so white as to be bright"

loek-  tingting

black  something looks dark

"黑漆漆，something is so black as to be dark"

tax   fous-qiettqiett

rice  hot   something looks hot

"饭热乎乎，the hot rice"

7.     The word "enyx" is used to describe something small, and can either be placed before the noun or after; either way the emphasis is on the latter word, e.g., 

 
The word "long" is used to describe something big or large, and can either be placed before the noun or after; either way the emphasis is on the former word, e.g., 

 
Another way to express something big or large is to add the prefix "bais-" to nouns related to objects/things; but, if the prefix "bais-" is added to nouns related to mankind/persons, it becomes an indicator of gender, e.g., 

 
Nouns that have the prefix "bais-" added on to them can be modified by the word "long" to increase the degree, e.g.,

big   tree              big

"很大的树，large tree"

big   stone  big

"很大的石头，large stone"

If the speaker intends to increase the degree, the word "dhat" or "dhatdhat" can be added.

Numbers
 

Numbers in Hlai language, including cardinal numbers, ordinal numbers, and numbers of approximation, usually act as subjects, predicate, or objects in a sentence. When numbers are used with classifiers, together they become a phrase that can be an attribute to modify the noun phrase.

Cardinal numbers

Basic numbers units
 【ceuus/zeuus/zuu，一】: one (in some case, the word "lax" also mean the digit—"one")
 【hlaus，二】: two
 【fus，三】: three
 【caus，四】: four
 【ba，五】: five
 【dom，六】: six
 【tou，七】: seven
 【ghou，八】: eight
 【fauus，九】: nine
 【fuet，十】: ten
 【ghwaen，百】: hundred
 【nguen，千】: thousand
 【vaens，万】: ten thousand

Basic numbers unit combinations
 【fuet ceuus，十一】: eleven
 【fuet hlaus，十二】: twelve
 【hlaus fuet，二十】: twenty
 【fus fuet ba，三十五】: thirty five
 【lax ghwaen hlaus fuet，一百二十】: one hundred twenty
 【caus nguen uengx ceuus，四千零一】: four thousand zero one (4,001)
 【zuu vaens，一万】: ten thousand

C. Cardinal numbers by themselves usually cannot modify nouns, but need to be placed before a classifier to modify the noun that goes after the classifier, e.g., 

However, in relation to dates (like year, month, day), numbers can modify these types of nouns without classifiers.

D. Cardinal numbers cannot be doubled, except for with "nguen" and "vaens"; when their pattern is AABB, and the resulting phrase means a number of great amount, e.g., 

Sometimes, the words "nguen" and "vaens" combine with "jieng" or "zuu" to form an ABAC phrase to modify a noun, synonymous in meaning to the AABB pattern, e.g.,

E. There are four words ("zuu", "ceuus/zeuus", and "lax") that can represent the place value of "one", but each word has its own usage. 

First, when Hlai people count, they will say, "ceuus/zeuus, hlaus, fus, caus…(1, 2, 3, 4…)", they won't use "zuu" or "lax" for one.

The word "zuu" needs to go with a classifier to modify a noun.

The digit 1, when it is either in the 100's, 1,000's, 10,000's, 100,000's.... place of a number, the word "zuu" should be used for 1, e.g.,

The digit 1, when it is either in the 10's or 1's place of a number, the word "ceuus/zeuus" should be used for 1, e.g.,

However, if the number is used with a classifier, then the word "zuu" should be used, e.g.,

The word "lax" cannot be used with a classifier. The word "lax" only can be used in the first digit when the number is bigger than ten. However, if the number is multiple of 10 like 100, 1000, 10000...etc., the word "zuu" should be used, instead of "lax". e.g.,

F. There are two words ("fuet" and "bun") that are used for the place value of "ten," but each word has its usage. 

First, "fuet" is used for the number ten when counting. 
 
"Bun" does not need to go with a classifier to modify a noun. However, if the word "bun" does go with a classifier to modify a noun, the only two classifiers that can be used are "hom" and "lang"; but when "lang" is used with people, "bun" cannot be used.

"Fuet" needs to go with a classifier to modify a noun, e.g.,

However, "fuet" can be placed in front of nouns, which are also classifiers, e.g.,

Zero
In Hlai language, there is no word for the number "zero"; some areas adopted the loan word "lengs" (零，zero), e.g.,

However, the number "zero" can be represented by the conjunction "uengx" or "loms", e.g.,

H. In Hlai language, there are two rules to construct numbers 

(1) when any single digit from 1 to 9 is placed after "fuet", "ghwaen", "nguen", or "vaens", the relation between the digit and the word is addition, e.g.,

(2) when any single digit from 1 to 9 is placed before "fuet", "ghwaen", "nguen", or "vaens", the relation between the digit and the word is multiplication, e.g.,

Ordinal numbers
A.    In Hlai language, the word "ghwous" (头，head) or "ceuus" (一，one) means "first", and the word "cuty" (尾，tail) means "last"; for all numbers in between first and last, the word "tom" (中间，middle) is used.

hluuek-ghwous-ghwa

child     head      to plant

"老大（长子），the first born child (usually, it means "son")"

hluuek-tom

child    middle

"老二，老三…，the child(ren) in the middle"

hluuek-cuty

child     tail

"老幺，the youngest child"

When one's gender is needed, the word "pasmaen" (男人，man) or "baiskaux" (女人，woman) can be added, e.g.,

hluuek-pasmaen-ghwous-ghwa    = hluuek-ghwous-ghwa

child     man        head      to plant = child     head     to plant

"长子，the first born son"

hluuek-baiskaux-ghwous-ghwa   =  hluuek-baiskaux-long

child     woman    head     to plant = child     woman    big

"大女儿，the first born daughter"

Usually "ghwous" indicates the oldest male; "long" the oldest female, like "kauuslong" (大姐, oldest sister), "zoulong" (大嫂，wife of oldest brother).

Moreover, the prefix "pas-" (男性，man) or "bais-" (女性，woman) can be added to the words "tom" and "cuty", to indicate gender, e.g.,

pas-            tom

male prefix  middle

"次子，the son in the middle"

bais-              cuty

female prefix  tail

"幺女，the youngest daughter"

When ordinal numbers apply to things, usually the phrase is constructed by "ghwous" + "zuu" + a proper classifier to represent the first one, e.g.,

ghwous  zuu  kuuengx

head       one  classifier for tree

"头一棵，the first (tree)"

To present the last one, usually the phrase is constructed with the words "baiscuty" + "zuu" + a proper classifier, e.g.,

baiscuty  zuu  hom

last/tail    one   classifier

"最后一个，the last (one)"

To present the middle one(s), usually the phrase is constructed with the words "baistom" + "zuu" + a proper classifier, e.g.,

baistom  zuu lang

middle    one  classifier

"第二，或第三…，the 2nd, or 3rd…"

Counting with ordinal numbers

Usually, any accuracy in communication is done with loan words from Chinese, e.g.,

 【dhoeis-iet，第一】: first
 【dhoeis-dzis，第二】: second
 【dhoeis-das，第三】: third
 【dhoeis-dis，第四】: fourth
 【dhoeis-ngau，第五】: fifth
 【dhoeis-laekk，第六】: sixth
 【dhoeis-qiet，第七】: seventh
 【dhoeis-bhoeix，第八】: eighth
 【dhoeis-gaeus，第九】: ninth
 【dhoeis-dapp，第十】: tenth

dhoeis-iet  dus

first            group

"第一组，the first group"

dhoeis-bhoeix  dhuix

eighth               team

"第八队，the eighth team"

dhoeis-dzis  bhaenx

second         class

"第二班，the second class"

C.  For counting the passage of years, months, days, or time 

In Hlai culture, people use a way similar to the Chinese Zodiac to count years, and even days, e.g.,

 year
 【boux-diu，鼠年】: the year of the mouse
 【boux-duis，牛年】: the year of the buffalo
 【boux-cauus，鱼年】: the year of the fish
 【boux-bous，兔年】: the year of the rabbit
 【boux-dang，龙年】: the year of the dragon
 【boux-zan，虫年】: the year of the insect
 【boux-ngas，马年】: the year of the horse
 【boux-mat，人年】: the year of the man
 【boux-nok，猴年】: the year of the monkey
 【boux-kai，鸡年】: the year of the chicken
 【boux-tety/hwanba，狗年】: the year of the dog
 【boux-bou，猪年】: the year of the pig
 day
 【hwan-diu，鼠日】: the day of the mouse
 【hwan-duis，牛日】: the day of the buffalo
 【hwan-cauus，鱼日】: the day of the fish
 【hwan-bous，兔日】: the day of the rabbit
 【hwan-dang，龙日】: the day of the dragon
 【hwan-zan，虫日】: the day of the insect
 【hwan-ngas，马日】: the day of the horse
 【hwan-mat，人日】: the day of the man
 【hwan-nok，猴日】: the day of the monkey
 【hwan-kai，鸡日】: the day of the chicken
 【hwan-tety/hwanba，狗日】: the day of the dog
 【hwan-bou，猪日】: the day of the pig

For counting months, in Hlai culture, there are two kinds of calendar: one is following the Han's solar calendar, e.g.,

 【zuu-nyaen-baen，一月、正月】: January
 【hlaus-nyaen，二月】: February
 【fus-nyaen，三月】: March
 【caus-nyaen，四月】: April
 【ba-nyaen，五月】: May
 【dom-nyaen，六月】: June
 【tou-nyaen，七月】: July
 【ghou-nyaen，八月】: August
 【fauus-nyaen，九月】: September
 【fuet-nyaen，十月】: October
 【fuetceuus-nyaen，十一月】: November
 【fuethlaus-nyaen，十二月、腊月】: December

The other is following the Han's lunar calendar, e.g.,

 【zuu-hwan-nyaen，初一】: the first day of a lunar month
 【hlaus-hwan-nyaen，初二】: the second day of a lunar month
 【fus-hwan-nyaen，初三】: the third day of a lunar month
 【caus-hwan-nyaen，初四】: the fourth day of a lunar month
 ..........
 【fuetceuus-hwan，十一日】: the 11th day of a lunar month
 【fuetceuus-hwan，十二日】: the 12th day of a lunar month
 ..........
 【hlausfuetceuus-hwan，二十一日】: the 21st day of a lunar month
 【fusfuet-hwan，三十日】: the 30th day of a lunar month

Number of Approximation

A.   In Hlai language, one way to represent approximate numbers is to place two or three sequential numbers together, e.g., 

hlaus  fus    (hom)

two     three  (classifier)

"两三（个），two or three"

ba   dom (hom)

five  six.   (classifier)

"五六（个），five or six"

hlaus  fus     caus (hom)

two     three  four  (classifier)

"二三四（个），two, three, or four"

tou      ghou fauus (hom)

seven  eight  nine  (classifier)

"七八九（个），seven, eight, or nine"

Usually, the numbers one and two are not put together.

B.  Another way to represent approximate numbers is to use the word "dzaengsloepp" (大约/大概，probably), e.g., 

dzaengsloepp  zaux fuet  dom  hom

probably         have   ten   six   classifier

"大概有十六个，probably have sixteen (ones)"

dzaengsloepp  zaux  hlaus  fuet  boux he

probably          have  two     ten  year   accent

"大概有二十岁，about twenty years old"
 
The word "dzaengsloepp" also can be shortened to "loepp",e.g.,

loepp       zaux tou      fuet  ceuus kuuengx

probably  have  seven  ten  one     classifier for tree

"大约有七十一棵，probably have seventy-one (trees)"

C.  Another way to represent approximate numbers is to use the word "dza" (余，a surplus/more than), e.g., 

hlaus  dza       hom

two     surplus  classifier

"两个多，more than two (less than three)"

fuet  dza       boux

ten   surplus  year

"十多年，more than ten years (less than twenty)"

The word "dza" can also be used with "loepp" to represent approximate numbers. The construction is "loepp" + zaux + number + "dza", e.g.,

Na  loepp      zaux  fuet dza        boux  da  buuen  he.

he   probably  have ten   surplus  year  not  come   accent

"他大约有十余年没来了，He hasn't come (to this place) for more than ten years."

The word "zaux" in this construction can be omitted, e.g.,

Zuu  hom         as                  neix  loepp      fuet  dza        gins.

one  classifier  watermelon  this   probably  ten  surplus  classifier, about 500g

"这个西瓜大约有十多斤，This watermelon is a little more than 10 gins."

D.   There are some synonyms, like "zuugit", "zuugitgit", "zuugitlaei", that can be used to represent approximate numbers. These words indicate the uncertainty of a small amount, e.g., 

Na  naus        lax   zuugit       vi!

he   just/only   eat   a little bit accent

"他才吃一点点，He only ate a little bit.)"

Hou  zaux  zuugitgit.

I        have  a little bit

"我有一点点，I have a little bit.)"

bhinx  zuugitlaei

lack    a little bit

"缺了一点点，lacks a little bit."

The word "zuutom" (一部分，a part/some) represents the uncertainty of a given amount, e.g.,

zuutom  hei zuutom  buuen

some     go   some    come

"一部分（人）去，一部分（人）来，Some (people) go, some (people) come."

paem  na dhuus  zuutom  guen

meet   he  in        part         way

"在半路上碰见他，meet him part way"

Sometimes, the word "zuutom" means "half",e.g.,

zuu  pas                       zuutom

one  classifier for man  half

"一人一半，each one (gets) half"

Another word to represent the uncertainty of a given amount is "gei" (几, 若干, several), which implies the amount is less than ten, e.g.,

gei        hwan neix

several  day    this

"这几天，these days"

Mansnyoengx  zaux gei         zuen        aeu  buuen.

only                 have  several  classifier man  come

"只有几个人来，Only a few people come (less than ten)"

E.   The word "hloei" (多, many/much) can represent the uncertainty of a great amount; if the amount is even greater, this word, "hloei" is repeated, "hloeihloei", e.g.,  

Bhous  na hauux  hloei   duis                dhat.

village   he   that    many  water buffalo  very

"他那个村牛很多，There are a lot of buffalo in his village."

Dhuix  fa  neix  zaux  uxaeu hloeihloei.

team   we  this have  man     so many

"我们这个队有许多人，We have so many people on this team."

When a certain amount is requested, the word "hloeiras" (多少，how many/much) can be used in an interrogative sentence, e.g.,

Meuu  boux neix hloeiras      boux?

you      year  this how many  year

"你今年多大岁数？How old are you this year?"

Meuu  zaux  hloeiras      zuen        hluuekghueng?

you     have  how many classifier  younger sister or brother

"你有多少个弟弟妹妹？How many younger brothers and sisters do you have?"

Classifiers

1.   Classifiers that modify nouns

A.    Common classifiers 
•   【hom，个、块、所、颗、粒、朵、元、座、盏、顶...】: most frequently used, and used with inanimate objects (including fruit, month, story, building, flower, money, mountain, light-stand, hat...), e.g.,

zuu  hom         waeu

one  classifier  bowl

"一个碗, a bowl."

•   【zuen，位】: it is only used with humans, e.g.,

hlaus  zuen       bhiengs

two    classifier  soldier

"两个士兵, two soldiers"

•   【laus，个、位】: it is only used with males whether a baby, child, boy or young man, e.g.,

zuu  laus         hluuek

one  classifier  child

"一个男孩, a boy"

•   【hauus，个、位】: it is only used with females whether a baby, child, girl or young woman, e.g.,

hlaus  hauus      hluuek

two     classifier  child

"两个女孩, two girls"

•   【lang，只】: it can be used with humans, animate objects and spiritual beings, e.g.,

fus     lang          kai

three  classifier  chicken

"三只鸡, three chickens"

•   【kuuengx，棵】: it is used with larger plants (flowers use "hom"), e.g.,

caus  kuuengx cai

four   classifier  tree

"四棵树, four trees"

•   【fans，件】: it is used with shirts or blouses, e.g.,

ba    fans       veengs

five  classifier  shirt/top

"五件衣裳, five shirts or blouses"

•   【hyax，条、件】: it is used with trousers/pants, e.g.,

hlaus  hyax        kous

two     classifier  pants

"两条裤子, two pairs of pants"

•   【ruet，条】: it is used with skirts, e.g.,

zuu  ruet          riens

one  classifier  the traditional Hlai skirt

"一条筒裙, a skirt"

•   【tos，套】: it is used with a suit of clothes or an outfit, e.g.,

zuu  tos           veengs   kous

one  classifier  shirt/top  pants

"一套衣服裤子, a suit or outfit having a matching top and bottom"

•   【tut，套】: it is used with a suit or outfit of clothes, e.g.,

zuu  tut            veengs

one  classifier  shirt/top

"一套衣服, a suit of clothes"

•   【dhanx，条、根】: it is used with linear objects, e.g.,

zuu  dhanx      dhoei

one  classifier  rope

"一根绳子, a rope"

dom  dhanx     noms

six     classifier  river

"六条河, six rivers"

•   【viens，块，张】: it is used with massive or planar objects, e.g.,

tou      viens        noeng duis

seven classifier   skin     water buffalo

"七张牛皮, seven pieces of cow hides"

•   【rueis，块、张】: it is usually used with flat surfaced planar objects, e.g.,

hlaus rueis         aek    bou

two     classifier  meat  pig

"两块猪肉, two slabs of pork"

fus     rueis        noeng loei

three  classifier  skin    muntjak

"三张麂子皮, three pieces of chamois (small antelope) hide"

•   【ban，头、只】: it is used with cows or horses, e.g.,

hlaus  ban          gas

two     classifier  horse

"两匹马, two horses"

•   【pous/paus，堆】: it is used with a relative smaller pile (pous/paus is also a verb), e.g.,

zuu  pous       van

one  classifier  earth

"一堆土, a pile of earth"

zuu  pous       guns

one  classifier  firewood

"一堆柴, a pile of firewood"

•   【kun，堆】: it is used with a relative bigger pile, e.g.,，

zuu  kun          muens

one  classifier  rice in the husk

"一大堆稻谷, a large pile of rice"

•   【baep，把】: it is usually used with seedling (There is no wheat on the Island of Hainan/Hlai people's territory.), e.g.,

zuu baep       fan

one  classifier  seedling

"一把秧, a handful of rice seedlings"

•   【hax，把】: it is usually used with rice, e.g.,，

zuu  hax         muens

one  classifier  rice

"一把稻子, one handful of rice"

•   【bhaeng，间】: it is usually used with a room or building, e.g.,

zuu  bhaeng    blongs

one  classifier  house

"一间屋子, a building/house"

zuu  bhaeng   qiafei

one  classifier  train

"一节火车厢, a box car"

•   【bhaengs，梭/颗、封】: it is usually used with letters (a written communication as one sent through the mail) a bullet or a firecracker, e.g.,

zuu  bhaengs  veji

one  classifier  bullet

"一梭/颗子弹, a bullet"

zuu  bhaengs  dienx

one  classifier  letter

"一封信, a letter"

•   【bhak，块】: it is usually used with flat objects, e.g.,

zuu  bhak        gias

one  classifier  glass

"一块玻璃, a piece of glass"

zuu  bhak        qias

one  classifier  paper

"一块硬纸片, a piece of cardboard"

•   【bheek，幅】: it is usually used with a picture or painting, e.g.,

zuu  bheek      ueix

one  classifier  picture/painting

"一幅画, a picture/painting"

•   【bhuek，把】: it is usually used with straw, e.g.,

zuu  bhueks    ngwiengs

one  classifier  straw

"一把稻草, a handful of straw"

•   【bhui，本】: it is usually used with books, e.g.,

hlaus  bhui         qias

two     classifier  book

"两本书, two books"

•   【cax，座】: it is usually used with mountains, e.g.,

zuu  cax         hwous

one  classifier  mountain

"一座山, a mountain"

•   【ceuus，枝、秆】: it is usually used with a pen or stick, e.g.,

zuu  ceuus     bhit

one  classifier  pen

"一支笔, a pen"

•   【cueng，枚】: it is usually used with a needle, e.g.,

zuu  cueng     guty

one  classifier  needle

"一枚针, a needle"

•   【dhien，畦or 幅】: it is usually used with farmland (rectangular plots of land in a field, separated by ridges, usually for growing vegetables), also used with cloth, e.g.,

zuu  dhien        van            bheuudaeis

one  classifier  land/earth vegetables

"一畦菜地, a bed of vegetables"

zuu  dhien      dhop

one  classifier  cloth

"一幅布, a piece of cloth"

•   【dhun，户、家】: it is usually used with households, e.g.,

bhous  fa    zaux  hlaus  fuet dhun        blongs.

Village  our  have  two    ten   classifier  households

"我们村子有二十户人家, There are twenty households in our village."

•   【gas，辆、架】: it is usually used with a car or a plane, e.g.,

zuu   gas         qia

one   classifier  car

"一辆车, a car"

zuu  gas         vabheny

one  classifier  airplane

"一架飞机, an airplane"

•   【ghoeix，行、排】: a row, a line, e.g.,

fus     ghoeix     cai

three  classifier  tree

"三行树, three rows of trees"

zuu  ghoeix    qias

one  classifier  word/letter

"一行字, one line of words"

•   【ha，缕】: it is usually used with light.

•   【hus，副】: it is usually used with playing cards, poker.

•   【hwoens，堆、块】: it is usually used with fields or objects that can be organized in a pile, e.g.,

zuu  hwoens    guns

one  classifier  firewood

"一堆柴火, a pile of firewood"

zuu  hwoens   dax

one  classifier  field

"一块水田, a field"

•   【hluut，层】: it means "layers" or "levels", e.g.,

fus     hluut        laeus

three  classifier  the floor in building

"三层楼, three floors"

Van    neix zaux  fus      hluut        na.

Land  this   have three  classifier  thickness

"这土有三层厚, This soil has three layers."

•   【ka，枝】: it is usually used with branches, e.g.,

zuu  ka           cai

one  classifier  tree

"一枝树枝, a branch"

•   【kok，棵】: it is usually used with mushrooms, e.g.,

zuu  kok          dhety

one  classifier  mushroom

"一棵菌子, a mushroom"

•   【koen，只】: it is usually used with one object in a pair, e.g.,

zuu  kuen       zuugoems

one  classifier  shoe

"一只鞋, a shoe"

zuu  koen        fiek

one  classifier  classifier

"半挑东西, a pole balanced on a shoulder by half a load being carried in the front and the other half being carried in the back (fiek: the action of carrying stuff on a shoulder becomes a classifier)."

•   【kou，张、顶】: it is usually used with mesh, e.g.,

zuu  kou         ghoeis  hla

one  classifier  net      fish

"一张鱼网, a fishing net"

•   【liemx，瓣】: it is usually used with a clove or segment of fruit, e.g.,

zuu  liemx       coembhem

one  classifier  grapefruit

"一瓣柚子, a piece of grapefruit"

•   【leep，叠】: it is usually used with thin objects like paper, e.g.,

hlaus leep          qias

two     classifier  paper

"两层纸, two sheets of paper"

•   【leeps，瓣、片、层】: it is usually used with thin objects

•   【luuengs，把】: it is usually used with a saw (tool for sawing)

•   【moux，种、类】: it means a "kind, sort", e.g.,

neix  zuu  moux       hleny

This  one  classifier good

"这一种好, This is a good one."

zaux  hlenyhloei moux      muens

have  many         classifier  rice

"有好多种稻子, There are many kinds of rice."

•   【paeng，串】: it is usually used with fruit, e.g.,

zuu  paeng     zuuloengs

one  classifier  betel nut

"一串槟榔, a cluster of betel nut"

•   【pienx，把】: it is usually used with knives e.g.,

zuu  pienx      gas

one  classifier  knife

"一把刀, a knife"

•   【puens，杆、根】: it is usually used with tree trunks or any bar-like or rod-like objects, e.g.,

zuu  puens     cai

one  classifier  tree

"一根树干, a stump (or tree trunk)"

zuu  puens     bhit

one  classifier  pen

"一支笔, a pen"

•   【raeis，块、片】: it is used with fields, e.g.,

zuu  raeis         dax

one  classifier  field

"一片田, a field"

•   【ras，棵，株】: it is usually used with grass or rice, e.g.,

zuu ras           gans

one  classifier  grass

"一棵草, a blade of grass"

•   【rok，块】: it is usually used with hillside fields (fields far from a water source), e.g.,

zuu  rok          ang

one  classifier  field

"一块刀耕地, a field"

(ang: specifically, a burned up plot of land that is fertilized for future farming by the remaining ashes; an ancient farming way of Hlai people, but now forbidden by the CN government)

fus     rok           pos

three classifier  hillside field

"三块旱地, three fields on the hillside"

•   【ruets，摞】: it is usually used with massive objects

•   【taeu，批、群】: it is usually used with a batch of goods or a group of animals, e.g.,

caty  zuu taeu         liem

buy   one  classifier  sickle

"买一批镰刀, buy a bundle of sickles"

zuu  taeu         dzeeng

one  classifier  goat/sheep

"一群羊, a flock of goats"

•   【tuueng，把】: it is usually used with farm tools, e.g.,

zuu  tuueng     rik

one  classifier  rake

"一把耙, a rake"

•   【vaen，梳、下】: it is usually used with comb-like, comb-shaped objects, e.g.,

zuu  vaen        hweek

one  classifier  banana

"一梳芭蕉, a bunch of bananas"

or it is used for counting the number of times of pestling, e.g.,

ceek    fuet  vaen

pestle  ten   classifier

"舂十下, pestle ten times"

•   【vans，张、页、幅、块】: it is usually used with paper products, e.g.,

zuu  vans         qia

one  classifier  paper

"一张纸, a piece of paper"

zuu  vans         diets

one  classifier  picture

"一幅照片, a photograph"

•   【voei，桶】: it is usually used with something that can be carried in a bucket, e.g.,

zuu  voei         ghei

one  classifier  rice

"一桶米, a bucket of rice"

•   【vong，嘟噜】: it is usually used with something formed as a cluster (tropical fruit is usually in clusters, such as coconuts, betel nuts), e.g.,

zuu  vong       coemcai

one  classifier  fruit

"一嘟噜果子, a cluster of fruit"

B.   Classifiers for measurement 
•   【mous，亩】: (Chinese acre) a unit of area to measure a land or field, about 667 square meters, e.g.,

zuu  mous       dax

one  classifier  field

"一亩田, one mu of field"

•   【dho，丈】: a unit of length to measure the length of linear objects, 1 dho is about 350 centimeters, e.g.

zuu  dho          dhop

one  classifier  cloth or textile

"一丈布, one zhang of cloth"

•   【qieux，尺】: a unit of length to measure the length of linear objects, 1 qieux is about 35centimeters, 10 qieux = 1 dho.

hlaus  qieux        dhop

two     classifier  cloth or textile

"两尺布, two feet of cloth"

•   【cuns，寸】: a unit of length to measure the length of linear objects, about 3.5 cm, 10 cuns = 1 qieux.

fus      cuns         dhop

three   classifier  cloth or textile

"三寸布, three inches of cloth"

•   【hlaenx，庹】: the length of two arms, about the height of a person, about 5–6 feet.

•   【hwuup，拃】: the distance between the thumb and the middle finger pressed down on a surface in a straight line, about 15–20 centimeters, e.g.,

zuu  hwuup    daeus

one  classifier  length

"一拃长, one zuo length"

•   【tunx，节】: the length of a finger, about 6–9 centimeters.

•   【dhas，石】: a unit of weight, e.g., fuetdhas ghei, "十石米 (fuet: ten, ghei: uncooked rice)." 1 dhas is probably equal to 150 gins, about 75 kg.

•   【dhaeu，斗】: a unit of weight, e.g.,zuu dhaeu ghei，"一斗米 (zuu: one, ghei: uncooked rice)."10 dhaeu = 1 dhas; 1 dhaeu = 10 kax = 15 gins, about 7.5 kg.

•   【kax，升】: a unit of weight, e.g.,fus kax ghei, "三升米 (fus: three, ghei: uncooked rice)." 1 kax = 1.5 gins, about 0.75 kg.

•   【gins，斤】: a unit of weight, e.g.,zuu gins hla，"一斤鱼 (zuu: one, hla: fish)." 1 gins = 16 luuengx; 1 gins = 0.5 kg.

•   【luuengx，两】: a unit of weight, e.g., zuu luuengxnyaeus，"一两盐 (zuu: one, nyaeus: salt)." 1 gins = 16 luuengx; 1 gins = 500 g; so 1luuengx = 31.25 g

•   【dhun，吨】: a modern unit of weight, 1000 kg, e.g., fauus dhun ghoei，"九吨铁, a ton of iron (fauus: nine, ghoei: iron)."

C.    Classifiers derived from nouns or verbs 
•   【kop，捧 or 把】: the original action of holding or carrying something in both hands becomes a measurement, e.g.,

zuu  kop         ghei

one  classifier  rice

"一捧米, one scoop of rice"

•   【koens，捆】: the original action of tying, binding or bundling up becomes a measurement, e.g.,

zuu  koens      hya

one  classifier  thatch or couch grass

"一捆茅草, a sheaf of thatch"

•   【bhiek，捆】: it is usually used with a bundle of objects that is carried on one's shoulders, e.g.,

zuu  bhiek      guns

one  classifier  firewood/sticks

"一捆柴, a bundle of firewood/sticks"

•   【zeems，撮】: the original action of picking up (with all five fingers) becomes a measurement, e.g.,

zuu  zeems     nyaeus

one  classifier  salt

"一撮盐,  one pinch (using all five fingers) of salt."

•   【jims，撮】: the original action of picking up (with the thumb and forefinger/index finger) becomes a measurement, e.g.,

jims       zuugit      nyaeus

pick up  a little of salt

"拈一点盐, a pinch (using only two fingers) of salt"

hlaus jims         nyaeus

two     classifier  salt

"两撮盐, two pinches of salt"

•   【fiek，担or 双】: the original action of carrying a pole (usually bamboo-made) on a shoulder that is used for measurements becomes a measurement for things that were carried on poles, e.g.,

zuu fiek          guns

one classifier  firewood

"一担柴a bundle of firewood"

zuu  fiek          zuugoems

one classifier  shoe

"一双鞋, a pair of shoes"

•   【gok，杯、瓶】: a cup (or a bottle), originally a noun, becomes a classifier, e.g.,

zuu  gok         noms

one classifier  water

"一杯水, a cup of water"

zuu  gok          ghweis

one classifier  oil

"一瓶油, a bottle of oil"

•   【waeu，碗】: a bowl, originally a noun, becomes a classifier, e.g.,

zuu  waeu      tax

one classifier  cooked rice

"一碗饭, a bowl of rice"

•   【boux/baux，岁】: a year, originally a noun, becomes a classifier, e.g.,

zuu  fuet  ghou  boux

one ten   eight classifier

"十八岁, 18 years old"

•   【bhaem，围】: the original action of embracing something with two arms becomes a measurement, e.g.,

hlaus  blaem      cai

two    classifier tree

"两围的树 tree size of two men's arms wrapped around it"

•   【comx，袋】: usually, objects that can be carried in bags that have become classifiers, e.g.,

zuu  comx       ghei

one classifier  rice

"一袋米, a bag of rice"

•   【ding，升】: a barrel (made of coconut shells), originally a noun, becomes a measurement, e.g.,

zuu  ding        ghei

one classifier  rice

"一升米, a barrel of rice"

•   【dhak，滴】: the original action is dripping; the meaning is "a drop", used as a classifier, e.g.,

zuu  dhak        noms

one classifier  water

"一滴水, a drop of water"

•   【dzuen，挂】: the stalk bananas grow on, originally a noun, becomes a classifier, e.g.,

zuu  dzuen      hweek

one classifier  banana

"一大挂芭蕉, a stalk of bananas"

•   【fas，阵】: as a noun it means sky, but it can also be used as a classifier, e.g.,

zuu  fas           fun

one classifier  rain/shower

"一阵雨, a (rain) shower"

•   【fiens，把】: as a noun it is the handle of farm tools, but it can also be used as a classifier, e.g.,

zuu  fiens       gwaek

one classifier  hoe

"一把锄头, a hoe"

•   【fok，块】: as a noun it is a place, area, or region, but it can also be used as a classifier, e.g.,

zuu  fok          gom     neix

one classifier region  this

"这块地方, this region"

•   【gieps，夹】: the original action is sheaving the thatch, but it can also be used as a classifier, e.g.,

hlaus  gieps      hya

two.   classifier  thatch

"两夹茅草, two sheaves of thatch"

•   【guengs，篮、框】: a basket, originally a noun, becomes a classifier, e.g.,

zuu  guengs    ghei

one classifier  hoe

"一筐米, a basket of rice"

•   【guety，串】: a stick for threading some objects together, originally a noun, becomes a classifier, e.g.,

zuu  guety       hla

one classifier  fish

"一串鱼, a string of fish"

•   【neny，串】: a bamboo stick for threading some objects together, originally a noun, becomes a classifier, e.g.,

zuu  neny        hla

one classifier  fish

"一串鱼, a string of fish"

•   【neny，枝】:  as a noun it means a little branch, but it can also be used as a classifier with a branch or flower, e.g.,

zuu  neny       ceeng

one classifier  flower

"一枝花, a flower"

•   【ghongs，丛】: as a noun it means a grove, but it can also be used as a classifier, e.g.,

zuu  ghongs   hweek

one classifier  banana

"一丛芭蕉树, a grove of banana trees"

•   【hoep，盒】: as a noun it means a box, but it can also be used as a classifier, e.g.,

zuu  hoep        cuax

one classifier  matches

"一盒火柴, a box of matches"

•   【hwang，圈】: as a noun it means a ring, ferrule, or band, but it can also be used as a classifier, e.g.,

zuu  hwang     zuu  hwang     noms

one classifier  one classifier  water

"一圈一圈的水, a ripple (of water)"

•   【hwaeng，垄】: as a noun it means a balk, that is to be heaped up with soil into ridges, e.g.,

zuu  hwaeng    man

one classifier  a general term for potato

"一垄甘薯, a ridge of sweet potatoes"

•   【hwoens，丘、床】: as a noun it means something lined up forming a pattern, e.g.,

zuu  hwoen     dax

one classifier  field

"一丘田, a field";

zuu  hyoen     haeus

one classifier  quilt

"一床被子, a quilt"

•   【op，抱】: the original action is holding a baby, e.g.,

zuu  op            guns

one classifier firewood

"一抱柴火, an armful of firewood"

•   【puuen，代】: as a noun it means seniority in respect to age, and as a classifier it means "generations," e.g.,

fa    buuen  neix  bhaeis   zaux  fus      puuen      bhe

We  come   here already  have  three  classifier  accent

"我们来这儿已有三代了, We've been here for three generations."

•   【rei，枝】: as a noun it means sprouts, and as a classifier it is used with sprouts.

•   【ruek，窝、笼、盒】: as a noun it means nest, cage, or box, and it can be used as a classifier, e.g.,

zuu  ruek         bou

one classifier  pig/hug

"一窝猪, a litter of pigs"

zuu  ruek        kai

one classifier  chicken

"一笼鸡, a cage of chickens"

zuu  ruek        aenx

one classifier  cake

"一盒点心, a box of cakes"

Sometimes, it is also used with urine, e.g.,

zuu ruek         dhou

one classifier  urine

"一泡尿, a stream of urine"

•   【taen，场、趟】: as a noun it means altar (usually for worship of the demons or the ancestors), but it can also be used as a classifier, e.g.,

bhaeis   vuek zuu  taen         dings.

Already  do     one classifier  demon

"已经祭了一趟鬼, (The priest) already sacrificed once to the demons."

•   【taeng，桶】: a bucket, originally a noun, becomes a classifier, e.g.,

zuu  taeng       noms

one classifier  water

"一桶水, a bucket of water"

•   【tiep，夹】: the original action is picking up food up with chopsticks, but as a noun it means chopsticks, which can be used as a classifier referring to the food amount that is taken up with a pinch of the chopsticks, e.g.,

zuu  tiep         bheuucai

one classifier vegetable

"一夹菜, a chopstick-pinch of food"

•   【tuck，包】: the original action is to wrap up; bind up; enclose; pack, but it can also be used as a classifier, e.g.,

zuu  tuek        dza

one classifier cigarettes

"一包烟, a pack of cigarettes"

•   【veeng，户】: as a noun it means lord or master, and as a classifier it can be used with households, e.g.,

zuu  veeng

one classifier

"一户(人家), a household."

•   【zaemx，步】: as a noun it means step, and the verb is stepping or walking, but it can also be used as a classifier, e.g.,

zuu  ghwaen   zaemx

one hundred  classifier

"一百步, one hundred steps"

•   【zeeng，穗、粒】: as a noun it means kernels (husks) of rice, but it can also be a classifier to mean the husks from a stalk of rice or something with larger kernels, e.g.,

zuu  zeeng     muens

one classifier  rice

"一穗稻子, a stalk of rice"

zuu  zeeng     nyaeus

one classifier  salt

"一粒粗盐, a grain of coarse salt"

2.   Classifiers for modifying verbs 
•   【faei，下、次、回】: time, e.g.,

taeix       zuu  faei

hit/beat  one  classifier

"打一下, to hit/beat once"

•   【gaeis，回、次、遍】: time, e.g.,

na         bhaeis   rien            hlaus  gaeis

he/she  already  say/speak  two    classifier

"他已经说了两遍了, He already said (it) two times."

•   【guen，趟、遍】: time, e.g.,

hei  zuu  guen

go   one  classifier

"去一次, go (there) one time"

•   【caety，阵、遍】: it is usually used by women, it means "time", e.g.,

bhaeis  fun  zuu  caety

Already rain  one  classifier

"下了一阵雨, It already showered."

kai          bhaeis   hyoen        fus      caety

Chicken  already  cock crow three  classifier

"鸡已叫了三遍, The chicken has already crowed three times."

•   【pienx，遍】: time, e.g.,

tak      zuu pienx

study  one  classifier

"读一遍, read one time"

•   【caeu，阵】: it is usually used by the elderly, it means "time", e.g.,

zuu  caeu       fun

one  classifier  rain

"一阵雨, a shower (describing rain)"

zuu  caeu       hwoet

one  classifier  wind

"一阵风, a gust of wind"

•   【caens，顿】: classifier for meal, e.g.,

zuu  caens      tax

one  classifier  rice

"一顿饭, a meal"

•   【kok，脚】: feet, e.g.,

teeks  zuu kok

kick    one classifier

"踢一脚, give (it) a kick"

•   【boms，口】: mouth, e.g.,

gaenys  zuu  boms

bite       one  classifier

"咬一口, to take a bite"

•   【feek，口or 句】: mouth, e.g.,

lax   zuu feek         tax

eat  one  classifier rice

"吃一口饭, to take a bite of food"

na         zuu feek         tun     ruus  da   rien

he/she  one  classifier word  even  not say

"他一句话也不说, He did not even say a word."

•   【pui，阵、遍】: it means "time" and is used to count sleep, e.g.,

gaux  zuu  pui

sleep  one  classifier

"睡一觉, time spent in rest/sleep"

The basic rules for Classifiers in Hlai language

1.    Classifiers cannot be doubled as AA (e.g., lang lang), but can be used in a AB+AB pattern, e.g., 
Daty  zuu  kun        zuu   kun        bheny.

bird   one  classifier  one  classifier  fly

"鸟成群成群地飞，Birds fly in groups."

2.    Classifiers cannot modify nouns alone; classifiers and numbers must be used together to modify nouns, e.g., 

one  classifier  dog  this   big    really/truly

"这只狗真大！This dog is really big!"

3.    Classifiers (for modifying verbs) and numbers must be used together and be placed after the verb as a complement; in some regions, the combination (number+classifier) would be placed before the verb, e.g., 
Raux          fus    gaeis     =Fus    gaeis       raux

read aloud  three classifier= three  classifier read

"读三遍，read three times"

Taeix  zuu guen     = Zuu  guen     taeix

hit     one classifier = one  classifier  hit

"打一次，to hit/punch one time"

4.    In some occasions, the combination of numbers and classifiers exists alone, whereby they are not modifying any nouns or verbs, e.g., 
Hou  caty zuu  hom,        meuu ngan  caty  zuu hom.

I        buy  one classifier  you      also  buy   one  classifier

"我买一个，你也买一个，I buy one, and you buy one."

Pronouns

There are three kinds of pronouns: the personal pronoun, demonstrative pronoun, and interrogative pronoun.

Personal pronouns

The different usage of "hou" and "dhes"

 The women prefer to use "hou" when women talk to women, or women to men. They prefer to use "hou" in order to express themselves as a humble woman and to show respect to their listeners.
 When a senior member of the family (an elderly, parents, older brothers or sisters...etc.) is angry with a junior, he/she could choose to use "hou" or "dhes"; on the contrary, juniors are forbidden to use "dhes" when speaking with the seniors in conversation, or when they are angry at them.
 Among blood relatives, when men speak to women, they use "hou"; when men speak to men, either "hou" or "dhes" can be used; when juniors speak to a senior, they usually use "hou".
 Among in-laws, no matter whether men, women, seniors, or juniors, when they speak to each other, the word "hou" is preferable to express politeness.
 Between hosts and guests, no matter the gender or age, the word "hou" must be used to express politeness and respect.
 When someone asks a who question, "Asras…?" If it is answered with the first personal pronoun, "hou" is preferable over "dhes", e.g.,

 If someone answers with the word "dhes", it expresses his impatient attitude. Usually, it occurs between family members' conversations, e.g.,

 When a man sings to a woman to express his love to her, he will definitely use "hou"; if he uses "dhes", she would think he is not sincere, e.g.,

 When someone speaks rudely, he uses "dhes" instead of "hou".
 In today's Hlai society, the difference between "hou" and "dhes" is not so strict. Generally, women mostly use "hou"; men usually use "dhes". The word "hou" expresses politeness and respect to the listener, and the word "dhes" is more casual.

P.S. My language consultant said: the word "kun" is a simplified form of "kunaeu". Usually, in a conversation held between those of the same gender group, "kun" is used; in a conversation held between those of different gender groups, "kunaeu" would be used to show respect. Or, if a conversation were made up of those from both the older and younger generation, the younger generation would need to use "kunaeu" to show respect toward the elderly.

Personal pronouns can be both a subject and an object, e.g.,

Personal pronouns can also act as an attribute to indicate the possessive relation, e.g.,

Reflexive pronouns can be an appositive to another pronoun to emphasize the pronoun, e.g.,

The auxiliary word "guu" can be placed before a personal pronoun to indicate the possessive relation. After placing the word "guu", the pronoun cannot be a subject, an object, nor an attribute, but only a predicate, e.g.,

Demonstrative pronouns
 【neix，这】: this; here; so; such
 【hauux，那】: that; there; so; such
 【max，那】: that; there

The word "neix" refers to someone, or something, at a close distance; the word "hauux" is farther away than the word "neix"; the word "max" is even farther. These three words also can be combined to the words "dhong" or "hi" and become compound words as below,
 【dhongneix，这】: like this
 【dhonghauux，那】: like that
 【hineix，这】: such
 【hihauux，那】: like that

Other demonstrative pronouns are:
 【uughwaix，别的】: other
 【ranx，每】: every

When a demonstrative pronoun acts as a subject, it is placed before the head word, e.g.,

When a demonstrative pronoun combines with a number, a classifier, and a noun to form a noun phrase, the demonstrative pronoun acts as an attribute, e.g.,

When a demonstrative pronoun acts as an attribute in a noun phrase, it can be placed either in the beginning or at the end of the noun phrase, e.g.,

If the linking verb is placed between the demonstrative pronoun and the noun, the demonstrative pronoun acts as a subject, e.g.,

The words "neix", "hauux", and "max" can be a subject, an attribute, an adverbial, and an object; the word "uughwaix" can be a subject, an attribute, and an object; the compound words "dhongneix", "dhonghauux", "hineix", and "hihauux" can be a subject, an attribute, an adverbial, and a predicate, e.g.,

There is no declension in demonstrative pronouns to indicate singular or plural. So, the demonstrative pronouns need to go with the number and classifier, or the word "zuugit" to indicate singular or plural, e.g.,

When the demonstrative pronoun acts as an attribute, it is usually placed after the head word, e.g.,

When the demonstrative pronoun is placed after the personal pronoun, or the interrogative pronoun, the demonstrative pronoun loses its meaning, and becomes an empty word that functions as an emphasis to make it sound fluent, e.g.,

The demonstrative pronoun "ranx" is only placed before the classifier, and can be doubled for emphasis, e.g.,

The demonstrative pronoun "uughwaix" can be an attribute and an object, e.g.,

Interrogative pronouns 
 【ras，哪，如何】: Where? Which? How?
 【uuras/asras，谁】: Who?
 【dhongras，怎样】: How?
 【qiras，何时】: When? What time?
 【hloeiras，多少】: How much? How many?
 【meshes，什么】: What?
 others

The interrogative word "uuras" ("asras") can be a subject, an attribute, or an object, e.g.,

Just like personal pronouns, when the auxiliary word "guu" isplaced before an interrogative pronoun, it indicates a possessive relation, and the interrogative pronoun cannot be a subject, an object, nor an attribute, but only a predicate, e.g.,

The interrogative word "meshes" cannot be a subject, only an attribute or an object, e.g.,

The interrogative word "ras" cannot be a subject, only an attribute, an adverbial or an object., e.g.,

When the word "ras" acts as an attribute, it is usually used with a number and clasiifier, and is placed before a noun, e.g.,

When the word "ras" acts as an adverb, it is usually placed after the adjective, e.g.,

The interrogative word "dhongras" usually acts as an adverbial, and is most often is placed before a verb, but sometimes it can be placed after a verb, e.g.,

The interrogative word "qiras" most often acts as an adverbial, and must be placed before the verb, e.g.,

The interrogative word "hloeiras" most often acts as an object, e.g.,

Adverbs

Negation 
【da，不】: not
【yous，不要，别】: Do not
 others

These adverbs modify verbs or adjectives, and usually are placed before the verbs or adjectives, e.g.,

When the adverb "da" modifies verbs or adjectives, and "zo", an accentuated emphatic particle, is placed at the end of the sentence, "da" means "not yet", e.g.,

When the adverb "da" is placed at the end of a sentence, then the word "da" signals a question, e.g.,

Degree
 【veau，最】: for expressing superlative degree
 【duix，最】: for expressing superlative degree (this is a loan word)
 【zangs，太】: too
 【nguenxges，更加】: more, even more (this is a loan word)
 【loeppvaix，恰恰，相当】: just right, just enough, exactly
 【dhat，很】: very
 【baisias，很，极，非常】: very much
 others

These adverbs are usually placed before the adjectives to modify them, e.g.,

But, the adverbs "dhat" and "baisias" are placed after the adjectives. These two words also can modify verbs, e.g.,

To increase the degree of something, two different adverbs can modify the same term, e.g.,

The word "dhat" can be doubled to increase the degree, e.g.,

Scope, extent, or range
 【ruus，都】: all
 【ngan，也，都】: also, all
 【nyoengx，仅，只】: only
 【mans，仅，只】: only
 others

These adverbs are usually placed before the verbs to modify them, e.g.,

These adverbs "mans" and "nyoengx" can be linked together to emphasize the voice, e.g.,

Timing
 【bhaeis，已经】: already
 【kuenx，先】: earlier, before, first, in advance
 【naeus，刚】: just, a moment ago
 【faets，正在】: in process
 【dhom，还】: still, yet
 【fan，就，便】: then (This word is usually used in a narrative when describing something.)
 【goms，就】: then (This word is usually used in a quote.)
 others

These adverbs cannot be doubled for intensity, except for the adverb "naeus", e.g.,

Adverbs for indicating timing usually modify verbs, and are placed before the verbal phrase, e.g.,

However, the adverb "kuenx" can also be placed after the verbal phrase, e.g.,

Duplication or continuation 
 【loms，又，再，还】: also, again,
 【uuloms，又，再，还】: also, again,
 【toengs，互相】: each other
 others

These adverbs modify verbs; the word "loms" or "uuloms" is placed before a verb, and the word "toengs" is placed after a verb, e.g.,

The verb being modified by the adverb "toengs" can be modified by other adverbs, which are placed before the verb, e.g.,

Emphasis or transition 
 【oms，又，却】: but, a signal word for a transition
 【naus，到底】: a signal word for emphasis
 【cuuslax，原来】: so, a signal word for a transition
 others

These adverbs modify verbs or adjectives, and usually are placed before the verb or adjective, e.g.,

A more unusual placement of these adverbs is at the beginning of a sentence, e.g.,

Conjunctions

Link nouns, pronouns, noun phrases, or verb-object phrases 
 【uengx，和，与】: and
 【ku，跟，同，和】: and, to, with
 【nyuek，同，和】: and, with
 others

That link nouns:

That link pronouns:

That link noun phrases:

That link verb-object phrases:

These conjunctions can be added to more than two nouns, pronouns, or phrases; These conjunctions can even be placed before the first noun, pronoun, or phrase, e.g.,

These conjunctions can also function as prepositions, as can be seen in the chart below:

The word "nyuek" is used in Hlai's folk song, and can be linked with a verb, e.g.,

Some adverbs, like "loms" (又，却，again) and "hloeis" (顺便，by the way, 而且 and), can also function as conjunctions, e.g.,

Link verbs, adjectives, and phrases
【cuus，或者，还是】: or
【cas，或者，还是】: or
【cuusnaus，还是】: or
 others

Generally, the word "cas" is a synonym of "cuus." Both can be used in indicative and interrogative sentences. But, another synonym "cuusnaus" can only be used in interrogative sentences, e.g.,

Link a single subordinate clause
 【hans，因为】: because
 【dosdzis，所以】: so
 【laeis，如果】: if
 【tom，但是】: but
 【dagoms，不然】: otherwise
 others

The word "dagoms" also means "not only" or "or", e.g.,

Link two or more clauses 

Generally, the word "danyoengx" or "dagoms" is the synonym of the word "dacaux", e.g.,

Relationships between linked elements

Parallel relationship 
The conjunction words that express a parallel relationship are "uengx" (和, and), "ku" (和, and), and "nyuek" (和, and), e.g.,

Progressive relationship 
The conjunctions that express a progressive relationship are "loms" (又, again), "hloeis"(并且, 而且, and), and similar phrases like "dacaux…koms…" (不但...而且...，not only... but also...), e.g.,

In the construction of phrases like "dacaux…koms…" ("not only…but also…"), the conjunctions "but also" ("koms", "uengx", or "toep") must be placed in the second clause, between the verb and the object.

Optional relationship 
The conjunctions that express an optional relationship are "cuus" (或, or), "cas" (或, or), "cuusnaus" (或, or), "casnus" (或, or), and "dagoms" (或, or), e.g.,

Transitional relationship 
The conjunctions that express a transitional relationship are "tom" (但是, but), "oms" (却, but), and "tus" (但是, but), e.g.,

Conditional relationship 
The conjunctions that express a conditional relationship are "laeis", "dalunx", e.g.,

Causal relationship 
The conjunctions that express a causal relationship are "hans" (因为, because), "dagoms" (不然, otherwise), e.g.,

Prepositions

Place, direction, or time

A. The prepositional phrase, which is constructed by the prepositions below, usually is placed after a verb, and acts as an adverbial to modify the verb. 
 【dhuus，在】: in, at, on
 【tuuen，从】: from
 【ueks，里】: inside

However, as more and more young generation Li have mingled with Han culture, they have gradually adopted Chinese grammar, and have placed the prepositional phrase before the verb, e.g.,

The word "ueks" can be placed after the preposition "dhuus", e.g.,

The prepositional phrase being constructed by the word "ueks" can also act as a subject, e.g.,

B. The prepositional phrase, which is constructed by the prepositions below, usually is placed after the verb, and acts as a complement. 
 【dhaens，到】: until
 【zok，往，向】: toward, to
 【dhuas，过】: through
 【buu，在】: on, in
 【beeng，沿】: along

C. The prepositional phrase, which is constructed by the prepositions below, usually is placed before a verb, and acts as an adverbial to modify the verb. 
【niens，沿】: along

However, the prepositional phrase of "niens" can also be placed after averb, e.g.,

Prepositions related to method 
【aens，按】: by, according to (this is a loan word)

Prepositions related to reason, or purpose 
 【guu ghais，为了】: for the purpose
 【uis，为了】: for (this is a loan word)
 【uislaeus，为了】: for (this is a loan word)
 【cuuslax，由于】: because of

The word "cuuslax" is only used in poetry as above.

Since more and more young generation Li have mingled with Han culture, sometimes they express the purpose by using the loan word "uis" or "uisliaeus".

Prepositions related to object

A. The prepositional phrase, which is constructed by the prepositions below, usually is placed after verbs, and acts as an adverbial to modify the verb. 
 【toep，连】: even
 【koms，连】: even
 【goem，对，和，与】: to, with
 【ku，对，和】: to

However, because of the influence of Chinese grammar, the "ku" prepositional phrase can also be placed before the verb, e.g.,

B. When a prepositional phrase, constructed by the preposition "dhuas," modifies an adjective as a complement, it indicates a comparison. 
 【dhuas，过】: than

C. The prepositional phrase, which is constructed by the prepositions below, usually is placed before the verb, and acts as an adverbial to modify the verb. 
 【uengx，和，跟】: with

However, the prepositional phrase using "uengx" can also be placed after the verb, e.g.,

5. Prepositions related to agent

A. The prepositional phrase, which is constructed by the prepositions below, usually is placed before the verb, and acts as an adverbial to modify the verb. 
 【ia，被】: by
 【ghoems，被】: by
 【dheuu，把】: by using

Auxiliary words

Structural auxiliary words
There are three words in the category of structural auxiliary words: "guu", "uu-", and "dhaens"

When the word "guu" is placed before a noun or a pronoun to indicate subordination, this combination functions as a possessive phrase, and can only be in the predicate of the sentence, e.g.,

However, the word "guu" can be omitted, e.g.,

The auxiliary prefix "uu-" can be added to some verbs or adjectives. After adding this prefix, the nominalized verb or adjective can be a subject, object, or an attribute, but cannot be a predicate, e.g.,

Another structural auxiliary word is "dhaens". It is usually placed after a verb or an adjective, and is followed by a complement that indicates the result or degree of the action/situation, e.g.,

Past tense auxiliary word
The word "dhuas" is placed after a verb to indicate an action has already happened, e.g.,

Acting-receiving auxiliary words
Both the auxiliary words "lax" and "dheuu" are often used to indicate the relationship of acting and receiving between an agent and a patient.

The original meaning of the word "lax" is "to eat", however, the meaning changes when it acts as an auxiliary word; the word "lax" is usually placed after the person-object in double-object sentences, even when the thing-object is absent.

The original meaning of the word "dheuu" is "to take", however, the meaning changes when it acts as an auxiliary word, e.g.,

Generally, the word "lax" and "dheuu" are exchangeable.

Accent markers

Indicative mood 
There are several words used in the indicative mood, like "lo", "bhe", "ve/vi", "he", "zu/zo", and "rus"

A. 【lo, 了】：this word indicates that something is in the process, or is forth coming, and it expresses the feeling of hope or surprise, e.g.,

B. 【bhe, 啊】：this word indicates something has already happened, and it usually does not express the subjective feeling, e.g.,

C. 【ve/vi, 的, 了】：this word indicates that the speaker is explaining something, and the speaker's tone is certain, e.g.,

D. 【he，啦】：this word indicates something has already happened, and it does not express the subjective feeling, and the speaker's tone is certain, e.g.,

E. 【zo/zu，还…呢】：this word indicates something is a fact or true, in which the speaker tries to persuade others, and the speaker's tone is certain, e.g., 

Sometimes the words "zo/zu" can have "ho" or "nex" added to them to put an emphasis on the mood, e.g.,

F. 【rus，呢】：this word indicates that something is not sure, and the speaker's tone is mild and indirect, tactful, e.g.,

Interrogative mood
There are several words used in the interrogative mood, like "hos", "yos", "os", "hyos", "zuumos", "huux", "hauux", "yax", "nex/nix", "zuurasve", "bas/vixbas", and "zuuras/cuusras".

A. 【hos，yos，os，hyos, zuumos，吗】：these words are used in common interrogative sentences, e.g.,

B. 【huux，hauux，呢，呀】：these words are used in sentences with an interrogative pronoun, e.g.,

C. 【nex/nix，yax，呢，呀】：these words are used in common interrogative sentences, e.g.,

D. 【zuuras/cuusras，吗】：these words are used in interrogative sentences where the speaker inquires by questioning closely, e.g.,

E. 【zuurasve，bas/vixbas，吧，了吧】：these words express a possibility, e.g.,

Imperative mood
There are several words used in the imperative mood, like "as", "bas", "res", "bhislo".

A. 【as，吧，啊】：this word is used to enjoin or to exhort someone to join in to do something, and the tone is soft and gentle, e.g.,

B. 【bas，啊，吧】：this word is used to command, to request, or to exhort someone to do something, e.g.,

C. 【bhislo，咯】：this word is used by one with a discontented mood to command, to request, or to hasten someone to do something, e.g., 

Sometimes the word "bhislo" is also used to put an emphasis on the indicative mood, e.g.,

D. 【res，吧】：the usage of this word is similar with the word "bas", however, the tone of the word "res" is kind and warm, e.g.,

Exclamatory mood
There are several words used in the exclamatory mood, like "ho", "a", "aei", "aiho", and "o". These words strongly express the speaker's feeling, e.g.,

Usually, these words are placed in the end of a sentence; however, sometimes these words act as one word sentences, e.g.,

Onomatopoeic words

Onomatopoeic words for expressing the feeling of surprise, exclamation, or agreement. Usually, these words are independent/separated from a sentence or clause, e.g.,

However, some onomatopoeic words can go with or within a sentence or clause, e.g.,

Onomatopoeic words for imitating human, animate, or nature sounds，e.g.,

More onomatopoeic words below:

Phrases in Hlai language

The Construction of Phrases and their basic rules in Hlai language

There are five kinds of phrases: the coordinative phrases, the attribute phrases, the verb-object phrases, the complement phrases, and the subject-predicate phrases.

1. Coordinative phrases 
The method used to coordinate equivalent elements in a coordinative phrase is to use conjunctions, but another method is not to use conjunctions. The nouns and pronouns sometimes use the conjunctions, sometimes they do not, e.g.,

Usually, the verbs and adjectives need conjunctions,

However, when the verbs and adjectives are doubled, there is no need for conjunctions, e.g.,

2.   Attribute phrases 
The elements in the attribute phrases are not equivalent; one element is the head word, and the other element is the modifier that modifies the head word. Usually, the head word is a noun, a verb, or an adjective.

A.   Noun as the head word 
Usually, the modifier is placed after the noun head word.

a.   Noun (the head word) + noun

aek    bou

Meat  pig

"猪肉，pork"

tun      Hlai

words Li

"黎话，Li's language"

hau    duis

horn  water buffalo

"牛角，buffalo's horn"

coem  cai

fruit     tree

"水果，fruit"

b.   Noun + adjective

noms  ghan

water  cold

"冷水，cold water"

veengs    baen 

shirt/top  new

"新衣服，new shirt/top"

rain  big

"大雨，heavy rain"

hwous      peek  

"高山，tall mountain"

The word "enyx" (小, small) is the exception where the modifier is placed before the head word, e.g.,

enyx   veengs

small  shirt/top

"小上衣，kid's shirt (it also means brassiere)"

enyx   duis

small  water buffalo

"小水牛，calf (young water buffalo)"

enyx   kai

small  chicken

"小鸡，chick"

enyx   dziengx

small   finger

"小指，little finger (pinkie)"

enyx   lauux

small   child

"小孩子，kid"

c.    Noun+ verb

fok     gaux

place  sleep

"睡的地方，a place for sleeping"

fok     hlau 

place  fight

"阵地，a place for fighting"

daty  bheny  

bird   fly

"飞的鸟，(a) flying bird(s)"

blong            kuishuix  

house/room  meet

"会议室，a room for meeting"

blong            roengx  tax  

house/room  cook     rice

"厨房，a room for cooking (kitchen)"

d.   Noun+ pronoun

pashlaus        hou

older brother  my

"我的哥哥，my older brother"

hwoek  meuu

heart     your

"你的心，your heart"

veengs  na

shirt/blouse     his/her

"他的衣服，his/her shirt/blouse"

caqias veengzauus

script    self

"自己的文字，our (own) script"

veengs    neix

shirt/top  this

"这衣服，this shirt/top"

blongs  hauux

house  that

"那房子，that house"

bhous  max

village  that

"那村庄，that village"

e.    Number + classifier + Noun (the head word)

The modifier, which is constructed with a number and classifier, must be placed before the head word, e.g.,

fus     zuen        aeudza

three  classifier old man

"三位老人，three old men"

hlaus  hom        dzuuem 

two     classifier  egg

"两个鸡蛋，two eggs"

ba   kuuengx cai

five classifier  tree

"五棵树，five trees"

caus  fan          veengs

four    classifier  shirt/blouse

"四件衣服，four shirts/blouses"

f.     Attribute phrases influenced by Chinese

Like Chinese, these modifiers are placed after the head word, and most of these words are loan words, e.g.,

Noun + noun (the head word)

Dongxgoknaengsmiens

China        people

"中国人民，Chinese people"

Adjective + noun (the head word)

hiuxdius  odex

superior   student

"优秀学生，superior student"

Verb + noun (the head word)

goeisgiet  muixdhoeis

resolve     problem

"解决问题，resolving (the) problem"

B.   Verb as the head word 
The modifiers that modify verbs are the adverbs, adjectives, pronouns, nouns, numbers, or verbs. Usually, the monosyllabic modifier is placed before the head word; the disyllabic/doubled adjective, the pronoun, or the number can be either placed before or after the head word, e.g.,

a.   Adverb + verb 
da   oep

not  love/like

"不喜欢，don't like"

bhaeis   lax

already  eat

"已经吃了，already ate"

yous   rien 

Don't  say

"不要说，don't say"

naeus  buuen 

just      come

"刚来，just came"

ais                  lax

not willing to  eat

"不肯吃，not willing to eat"

kueng             vuek 

know how to  do

"会做，know how to do"

hluums-ghweuu

not        recognize

"不知道，don't know"

b.   Adjective + verb 
dzuuns  rien

quick      say

"快说，(be)quick (to) say(it)" (it means out with it)

hleny  lax

good  eat

"好吃，good (to) eat" (it means delicious)

uns        fuuek

diligent make clothing

"勤纺织，diligent (to) make clothing"

gin     lax

hurry  eat

"忙吃，busy eating"

c.    Noun + verb 
cai      vuek

wood  make

"木做的，made of wood"

uuhaux     hei

tomorrow  go

"明天去，(will) go tomorrow"

hluuekueng     cat

girl                  wear

"姑娘穿，(for) girl (to) wear"

d.   Verb + verb (the head word) 
oep  lax

like   eat

"喜欢吃，like to eat"

dzok  dzueis

steal   look

"偷看，take a peek"

hei  dzok

go   steal

"去偷，go (and) steal"

bleuu  rien

listen   say

"听说，heard (others) say"

qieng           hei

desire/want  go

"想去，want (to) go"

gaux        dzueis

lie down   look

"躺着看，reading lying down"

e.    Disyllabic/doubled adjective + verb (the head word), or

Verb (the head word) + disyllabic/doubled adjective 
dais  dais   fei= fei    dais   dais

slow slow  walk

"慢慢走，walk slowly" (This is also used to say good bye.)

dzuuns  dzuuns raux = raux  dzuuns dzuuns

quick     quick    read

"快快读，read quickly"

hleny  hleny rien = rien hleny hleny

good  good  say

"好好说，say (it) nicely"

liloek vuek= vuek liloek

dark    do

"漆黑做，do (it in) darkness"

f.     Pronoun + verb (the head word), or Verb (the head word) + Number 
dhonghauux  nyop = nyop dhonghauux

like that        sew

"那样缝，sew like that"

dhongras  vuek? = vuek dhongras?

how           do

"怎么做？How is it to be done?"

qiras   hei? = hei qiras?

When  go

"何时走？When (is it time to) go?"

g.   Number+ verb (the head word), or Verb (the head word) + Number 
zuu  gaeis       hei = hei zuu gaeis

one  classifier  go

"去一趟，(make) a trip" (means to  run an errand)

fus     faei          taeix= taeix fus faei

three  classifier beat

"打三下，beat (something) three times"

zuu  kuuengx  zuu  kuuengx  ghwa= ghwa zuu kuuengx zuu kuuengx 

one  classifier one  classifier  plant

"一棵一棵地种，plant one by one"

zuu  boms       zuu  boms       lax= lax zuu bomszuu boms

one  classifier one  classifier  eat

"一口一口地吃，eat one (bite) at a time"

C.   Adjective as the head word 
The modifiers that modify adjectives are adjectives, adverbs, or pronouns. Usually, when the modifier is an adjective or adverb, the modifier is placed before the head word, e.g.,

a.   Adjective+ adjective (the head word) 
hleny  hloei

good  many

"好多，so many"

hleny  baen 

good  new

"好新，so new"

hleny   coem

good  sharp

"好锋利，so sharp"

reek  coem

bad   sharp

"坏锋利，not sharp"

b.   Adverb + adjective (the head word) 
da   hleny

not  good

"不好，not good"

vaeu   fous

most   hot

"很热，very hot"

duix   reek

most  bad

"最坏，worst"

loeppvaix    hleny

exactly  good

"恰好，exactly/perfectly good"

bhaeis   reek

already  bad

"已经坏了，already (gone) bad"

Only few adverbs, like "dhat" (真, 很, really, very) or "baisias" (非常, 极, very much, most), are placed after the head word, e.g.,

c.    Adjective (the head word) + adverb 
peek  dhat

high   very

"很高，very high"

dzuuns  dhat 

quick     very

"很快，very quick"

kaeix  baisias

cold    very much

"很冷，very cold"

hleny  baisias

good   very much

"很好，very good"

Also, when the modifier is a demonstrative pronoun, interrogative pronoun or noun, the modifier is placed after the head word, e.g.,

d.   Adjective (the head word) + demonstrative pronoun 
gwaety  hauux

orderly   that

"那么整齐，that orderly"

vaet  neix

poor this

"这么穷，this poor"

long  dhongneix

big    like this

"这么大，this big"

peek  dhonghauux

high  like that

"那么大，that high"

e.    Adjective (the head word) + interrogative pronoun 
bheeng  ras?

wide       How?

"多宽？How wide?"

daeus  ras?

long     How?

"多长？How long?"

peek  ras?

high    How?

"多高？How high?"

hloei             ras?

many/much how?

"多少？How many/much?"

f.     Adjective (the head word) + noun 
long  nyiu

big    bull

"大如黄牛，big as a bull"

bheeng  laengs

wide       sea

"宽似海，wide as the sea"

peek  blongs

tall     house/building

"高得像房子一样，tall as a building"

The construction of the phrase above actually is: Adjective (the head word) + dhong/bhaen + noun, the word "dhong" (像, as, like) or "bhaen" (像, as, like) is omitted, e.g.,

long  (dhong) nyiu

big     as          bull

"大如黄牛，big as a bull"

3.   Verb-object phrases 
The verb is the head word, and the object can be a noun, a pronoun, a number, or a verb. Usually, the verb is placed before the object, e.g.,

A.   Verb (the head word) + noun (object) 
lax  tax

eat  rice

"吃饭，eat rice (the meaning is to eat)"

vuek  gong

do     work

"做工，do work (the meaning is to work)"

taeix  kius

beat   ball

"打球，play ball (the meaning is playing a sport)"

dzueis  qias

look      book

"看书，read book (the meaning is to read)"

laix    dax

plow  field

"犁田，plow field (the meaning is to plow)"

B.  Verb (the head word) + pronoun (object) 
dheuu  hauux

take      that

"要那（个），take that one"

ngwaety  meuu

call          you

"喊你，(I'll) call you"

fiet     na

whip  him

"便打他，whip him"

bhiek                                         meshes？

carry (something) on shoulder  what?

"扛什么？carry what？"

C.  Verb (the head word) + verb (object) 
oep  lax

love  eat

"爱吃，loves to eat"

dhas  rien

fear    say

"怕说，fears to say"

dzueis  laeis

look      see

"看见，to see"

auux  vuuek

dare   do

"敢做，dare to do (something)"

D.   Verb (the head word) + number (object) 
caty  zuu hom

buy   one classifier

"买一个，buy one"

dheuu  hlaus lang

take     two    classifier

"拿两个，take two"

lax  fus    waeu

eat  three classifier

"吃三碗，eat three bowls (of food)"

E.   Verbal adjective (the head word) + noun (object) 
Some verbal adjectives can act as the head word with the noun as the object, e.g.,

leis   aeu

thin  people

"使人变瘦，(makes) people thin"

ghweis  aeu

Fat        people

"使人变肥，(makes) people fat"

4.    Complement phrases 
The Complement phrases include both a verb-complement phrase and an adjective-complement phrase.

A.   Verb-complement phrase 
The verb is the head word, and the complement can be a verb, an adjective, ora number with a classifier. The verb is placed before the complement.

a.   Verb (the head word) + verb (complement)

qieus  tuuen

take    go out

"拿出，take (it) out"

fei     hluet

walk  go into

"走进，walk in"

zuens  luei

jump    go down

"跳下，jump down"

dheuu  buuen

take     come

"要来，plan to come"

b.   Verb (the head word) + adjective (complement)

lax  kuuem

eat  full

"吃饱，ate (until) full (stuffed)"

riemx  hleny

fix       good

"修好，fixed well"

vuek  reek

do     bad

"做坏，made (it) broken"

roengx  fui

cook     cooked

"煮熟，cooked thoroughly"

c.    Verb (the head word) + number (complement)

raux  zuu feek

read  one classifier

"读一句，read one (sentence)"

dzueis  zuu fanx

look     one classifier

"看一会儿，look a while (glance)"

fei     zuu guen

walk  one classifier

"走一趟，(make) a trip" (means to run an errand)

fun  ba  hwan ba   cop

run  five day   five  night

"下雨五天五夜，(it) rained five days and five nights"

d.   Verb (the head word) + noun (complement)

In this case, the verb must be an intransitive verb, and the phrase can be an independent clause or a predicate.

bhaeis   hlaeux duis                he.

already  die       water buffalo  accent

"牛已经死了，The water buffalo already died."

B.  Adjective-complement phrase 
The adjective is the head word, and the complement can be a verb, an adjective, or a number with a classifier. The complement indicates the result of the head word, so usually the auxiliary word "dhaens" is placed between the complement and the head word.

a.   Adjective (the head word) + dhaens + verb (complement)

kaeix  dhaens  nyan

cold    as to     shiver

"冷得发抖，(so) cold as to shiiver"

bhoks  dhaens gax             fei

tire       as to      not able to  walk

"累到走不动，(so) tired as to not be able to walk"

reek  haeis  dhaens asras  ruus  ais                  dheuu

bad   smell as to      who    all     not willing to  take

"难闻到谁都不想要，(so) foul smelling as to not one is willing to take (it)"

b.   Adjective (the head word) + dhaens + adjective (complement)

gheuu dhaens  ghau

thin      as to     transparency

"薄到透明，(so) thin as to be transparent"

fui          dhaens  ghaens

cooked  as to     red

"熟到发红，(so) cooked (hot) as to become red"

fas     dhaens  cokghutyfan

sour   as to     teeth sour

"酸得牙齿发酸，(so) sour as to (turn) the teeth sour"

ghweis     dhaens  reekmuuen

fat            as to     ugly

"胖到难看，(so) fat as to look not good"

c.    Adjective(the head word) + number (complement)

long  fus    boux

big    three classifier/year

"大三岁，three years older"

hloei   zuu hom

many  one classifier

"多一个，one more"

raux  zuu hlaenx

lack  one classifier/arm spread (about 5~6 feet)

"少一庹，one arm spread shorter"

peek  zuutom ghwous

high   half       head

"高一半头，a half-head taller"

d.   Adjective (the head word) + noun (complement)

In this case, the adjective acts not as an attribute to the noun, but functions as expository to the noun. The phrase can be an independent clause or a predicate.

Long  hwoet  bhe！

big   wind    accent

"风大啊！The wind (is) strong!"

Cok  bok        dhat  lo！

hurt  stomach  very accent

"肚子痛得很厉害！A stomachache! (very painful)"

Lai  guen dhat  lo！

far  road   very  accent

"路远极了！The road (is) so far! (the meaning is the destination is so far away)"

5.   Subject-predicate phrases 

This kind of phrase is constructed by the subject and the predicate; usually, the subject is a noun or a pronoun, and the predicate is a verb or an adjective.

Wenysnaeis  aeu      rien  na  reek.

no                people  say   he bad

"没有人说他坏，No one said he (is) bad."

Uengxtoengs  ruus  rien  gong  neix fas.

everyone         all     say   stuff    this   sour

"大家都说这东西酸，Everyone (all) says this stuff (is) sour."

Daty  bheny  lo.

bird    fly        accent

"鸟飞了，Birds have flown (away)."

Na  buuen  lo.

he   come    accent

"他来了，He has come."

The construction of the subject-predicate phrase is the same as the attribute phrase.Usually, if there is an element, like an accent, an adverb, or a noun, that is either placed after or before the phrase, then it is a subject-predicate phrase. See the chart below:

Sentence construction and the basic rules 

The statements above are incomplete sentences. But, when we add some critical words, they become complete sentences to communicate a complete thought that makes sense to the listeners or readers, e.g.,

The chart below presents the grammatical elements that construct a sentence.These elements are a subject, a predicate, an object, a complement, an attribute and an adverbial phrase.

Subjects 
The subject is placed before the predicate; and either the nouns, pronouns, numbers, or phrases can be the subject.

Predicates 
The predicate is placed after the subject to provide information about the subject. Usually, verbs or adjectives are the predicate; however, nouns, pronouns, and  phrases can also be the predicate.

Passive voice
In the examples above, the subjects are the actors who act out the actions; however, the subjects can also receive the actions, which is called passive voice. Auxiliary words like "ia" or "ghoems" can be used to denote passive voice, e.g.,

Objects 
An object follows a verb. However, if the sentence is passive voice, the object can be placed before the verb phrase. Usually, a noun, pronoun or phrase can act as an object; sometimes, a number or verb can also be a subject, e.g.,

Double objects (with giving-receiving relation) 
The construction is Verb + person-object + lax/dheuu + thing-object, e.g.,

The auxiliary word "lax" can be replaced by the verb "duuengx" (给, give), then the construction becomes Verb + thing-object + duuengx + person-object, and the objects generally cannot be omitted, e.g.,

Sometimes, the verb "duuengx" (给, for) can be placed both before the thing-object and the person-object, then the sentence construction becomes Verb + duuengx + thing-object + duuengx + person-object, e.g.,

When both speaker and listener are clear what the thing-object is, or the subject itself is the given thing, the thing-object can be omitted, but the auxiliary needs to be kept, e.g.,

Double objects (without giving-receiving relation) 
Although some verbs in double-object sentences do not imply the giving-receiving relation, the auxiliary word "lax", which indicates that the subject is "helping" the person-object, is still needed. e.g.,

Hou  reengs meuu  lax.

I        move    you    auxiliary word (help)

"我帮你搬，I will help you (to) move."

Meuu  laix   na    lax.

You     plow  him auxiliary word (help)

"你帮他犁田，You help him (to) plow."

Baisdza  caep  hluuekbaiskaux  lax.

Mother    carry   daughter            auxiliary word (help)

"母亲帮女儿挑，A mother helps her daughter carry (the stuff)."

The auxiliary word "lax" can be followed by another object, e.g.,

Taeix   dhes lax                            tax.

Put      me    auxiliary word (help)  rice

"帮我打饭，Please help get me (some) rice."

Hou  caty  meuu lax                            bheuucai.

I        buy   you   auxiliary word (help) vegetable

"我帮你买菜，I'll help you buy (some) vegetables."

Na  rien  na kueng  poengs  meuu lax                             ceengcai.

He  say he  would  water    you    auxiliary word (help)   flower

"他说他会帮你给花浇水，He said he would help you water the flowers."

Complement 
There are three kinds of complements: sequential, directional, and quantitative complements. A complement goes after the verb or the adjective, in order to explain the sequence, degree, direction, or amount of the action. Usually, the verb, adjective, number, or phrase acts as a complement. Generally, a complement is placed after a verb, but if an object follows that verb, then the sequential complement and quantitative complement have to be placed after that object; the directional complement can either be placed after or before that object, e.g.,

A.   Sequential complement 
Dzax    ghoems taeix  hlaeux  bhe.

Snake  by           hit      die      accent

"蛇被打死了，The snake was beaten to death by (someone)."

Hou  bhaeis  lax   kuuem   he.

I        already  eat  full         accent

"我已经吃饱了，I have already eaten (rice) and am full."

Na  lax tax   kuuem  he.

He  eat  rice full        accent

"他吃饱饭了，He ate and is full."

If the sequential complement is a phrase, the prepositional word "dhaens" is needed to be placed before the phrase, e.g.,

Na  gwaeng dhaens        tuuen   nomswoms.

He  pull         preposition go out  sweat

"他拉到出汗，He pulled until he sweat."

Duis                ghoux  dhaens       ngaeix         noms  hauux.

Water buffalo  run       preposition  edge/bank river    that

"水牛跑到那河边，The water buffalo ran to the bank of that river."

Veengs    neix baen  dhaens        asras       ruus qieng  cat.

shirt/top   this   new  preposition  whoever  also  want   wear

"这衣服新到谁都想穿，This shirt is so new that everyone wants to wear it."

B.  Directional complement 
The directional complement is constructed by a verb + a directional verb, e.g., 

a.   Directional complement without an object

Most directional complements can act as a complement after alone verb, e.g.,

Na  qieus buuen  bhe.

He  bring   come  accent

"他拿来了，He brought something here."

Duis                ghoux   hei lo!

Water buffalo  run        go accent

"水牛跑去了，The water buffalo ran (away)."

Aeudza    buuen luueng    bhe

Old man  come    go back accent

"老人回来了，The old man came back."

Uengxtoengs  caep hei  beuu           bhe

Everyone        carry  go  come back accent

"大家挑回去了，Everyone carried (something) back (home)."

Na  ais                     caus.             luei     ba.

He  is not willing to  come down down  accent

"他不愿意走下来吧，He is not willing to come down."

Na  ghoux tuuen    hos?

He  run       go out  accent  of question

"他跑出来了吗？Did he run out (from there)?"

b.   Directional complement with an object

These three directional verbs, "dhuas", "kaen", and "hluet", need an object to go after them, e.g.,

Tuas     zuens dhuas  zuu  dhanx     dhaeix.

Rabbit  jump    over   one  classifier  stream

"兔子跳过一条小沟，The rabbit jumped over a stream."

Uengxtoengs  caem                       kaen    hwous     max.

Everyone         carry on shoulders  go up  mountain that

"大家抬到那山上，Everyone shouldered (something) up that mountain."

Diu       bhaeis  ghoux  hluet     cuengs he.

Mouse  already  run     go into  hole       accent

"老鼠已经跑进洞，The mouse already ran into the hole."

C.  Quantitative complement 
The quantitative complement, which is constructed by either (number + verbal classifier), or (number + time classifier), usually goes after a verb, sometimes goes after an adjective, e.g.,

a.   Verb + (number + verbal classifier)

Hou  uengx meuu  hei  zuu gaeis.

I        and      you    go  one  classifier

"我和你去一趟，I and you (can) go (there)."

Kai         bhaeis    hyoen  fus    dzax       bhe.

Chicken  already   crow    three classifier  accent

"鸡已经啼三遍了，The rooster has already crowed three times."

b.   Verb + (number + time classifier)

Fa   bhaeis  o        zuu  bhoux              he.

We  already  learn one  year/classifier  accent

"我们已经学一年了，We (have) already studied for one year."

Na  bhaeis  doengs  fus     hwan he.

He  already  stay      three  day     accent

"他已经住三天了，He (has) already stayed (for) three days."

Na  beuu      blongs  zaux  hlaus nyaen   bhe.

He  go back  home   have  two     month accent

"他回家有两个月了，He has been home for two months now."

c.    Adjective + (number + classifier)

Blongs  neix peek       dhuas  blongs hauux  zuugit.

"这房子比那房子高一点，This house (is just) a little bit taller than that house."

Waeu  neix hloei   fus     hom.

Bowl   this   more three  classifier

"这碗多三个，This bowl (has) three extra (ones)."

5.   Attribute 
The attribute is to modify or to define the subject or object, in order to indicate the characteristics, amount, or possession. Usually, the attribute, which can be an adjective, a noun, a pronoun, a number, a verb, or different kinds of phrases, is placed after the head word, except when a number acts as an attribute, the number must be placed before the head word, e.g.,

A.   Noun (head word) + noun (attribute) 
aek    duis

meat  water buffalo

"牛肉，beef"

feekx  hweek

skin    banana

"香蕉皮，banana peel"

coem  coeis

fruit     litchi

"荔枝果，litchi (fruit)"

dzuuem  kai

egg         chicken

"鸡蛋，chicken egg"

Na  kueng rien            tun                     Hlai.

He  know   say/speak language/word  Li

"他会说黎话，He knows(how to) speak the Li's language."

Neix  man bheuu  cai.

This   is      leaf     tree

"这是树叶，This is a tree's leaf."

B.  Noun (head word) + adjective (attribute) 
tau  loek

pot  black

"黑锅，black pot"

zuu  fans         veengs    kaeu

one  classifier shirt/top  white

"一件白上衣，one white shirt"

noms  neix  noms  ghan.

water  this   water cold

"这水是冷水，This water (is) cold water."

C.  Noun (head word) + pronoun (attribute) 
Gha  Hlai           zaux caqias  veengzauus  bhe.

We    Li people  have script    self               accent

"咱们黎族有自己的文字了，We, Li people, have our own script."

Hluuek         na         kweis          hei zok            Damxax.

Older sister  his/her is going to  go   to/toward Sanya

"他姐姐要去三亚，His older sister is going to go to Sanya."

D.   Number (attribute) + noun (head word) 
Zuu  zuen        aeu  dhuus  blongs max.

One  classifier  man  in         house  that

"一个人在那边房子，A man (is) in that house."

Hlaus  lang         duis               neix  ghweis dhat  dhat.

Two     classifier  water buffalo this  fat          very very

"这两头牛肥极了，These two water buffalos (are) very, very fat."

E.   Noun (head word) + verb (attribute) 
Dhuus  max  wenysnaeis  fok      gaux.

In/at     there  no                 place  lie down

"在那里没有地方睡，At that place, (there is) no place to sleep."

Toep  laty           ghoux  ruus  zeuu   loem.

Even  wild boar  run       also  shoot  right

"连跑的野猪也射中，He shot even a running wild boar right on."

Neix  gong lax   fa.

This   stuff   eat our

"这是我们吃的东西，This (is) our food ."

F.   Noun (head word) + phrase (attribute) 
veengs    dhuus blongs  hauux

shirt/top  in         house  that

"在那房子的衣服，the shirt (that is) in that house"

hluuekueng naeus  buuen  hauux

girl                just      come   that

"那位刚来的姑娘，that girl (who) just came"

zuu  lang        duis                 lax   gans  kuuem

one  classifier  water buffalo eat   grass  full

"一只吃饱草的水牛，a water buffalo (that) eats grass (until it's) full"

qi      meuu buuen  hauux

time  you      come that

"你来的那个时候，that time (when) you came"

6.   Adverbial 
The adverbial modifies or defines verbs or adjectives, in order to indicate the why, how, when, and where of the verb, or the degree of the adjective. Most often it is an adverb, an adjective, or a verb that acts as an adverbial; sometimes, a noun, a demonstrative pronoun, interrogative pronoun, a number, and various phrases can also be adverbials. Adverbials can either be placed before or after the verb or adjective. e.g.,

A.   Adverbs as Adverbials 
Most adverbs are placed before the verb or adjective, e.g.,

Na  oms  da   buuen  zo.

He  still    not  come   accent

"他还没来呢，He has not come (yet)."

Hwanneix  fas  vaeu fous  hos.

Today        sky  mosthot   accent

"今天天气很热啊，Today the weather (is) very hot."

Qi      lax  tax   yous  rien            tun!

Time eat  rice  don't say/speak  word

"吃饭时别说话！It is eating time, don't talk!"

Zuu  lang          aeu  neix  da   hlenymuuen.

One  classifier  man this   not  beautiful

"这个人不漂亮！This person (is) not beautiful."

Only fewadverbs, like "dhat", "luueng", "baisias" and "dhatdhat", are placed after the verb or adjective, e.g.,

Na  buuen  dhat.

He  come   really

"他真的来了，He really came."

Na  vuek  luueng.

He  do      back

"他重新做，He (is) re-doing (it)."

Gong  neix hleny  dhatdhat.

Stuff    this  good really

"这东西真好，This is really good stuff."

Maeis         neix dheeng  baisias.

Sugarcane  this   sweet   very

"这甘蔗非常甜，This sugarcane (is) very sweet."

B.  Adjectives as Adverbials
Most adjectives are placed before verb or adjective head words. Only a few adjectives, like "hleny" (好, good/so), and "reek" (坏, bad/not so), can be adverbials to modify adjective head words, e.g.,

reek           coem

bad/not so sharp

"不锋利，not so sharp"

Gas            neix  hleny       coem hos！

Long knife  this   good/so  sharp accent!

"这把刀好快啊！This knife is (so) sharp!"

Dais   fei    as,        baisdza！

Slow  walk  accent, old lady!

"慢走啊，老大娘，Slow(ly) walk, (lady/old woman)."

Meuu  dzuuns buuen  bhe！

You     quick     come   accent

"你快来吧，(You) quick(ly) come."

If an adjective is doubled, it can be placed after the verb, e.g.,

Meuu  buuen dzuunsdzuuns  bhe！

You     come   quick   quick    accent

"你快快来吧，(You) come double quick."

C.  Verbs as Adverbials 
When verbs act as adverbials to modify the head word, the head word must be a verb, and the adverbial verbs are placed before that head word, e.g.,

Na         ngais rien.

He/she  cry      say

"她哭着说，She said (it while) crying."

Meuu  dzok               dzueis  meshes?

You    steal/secretly  look     what

"你偷看什么？What are you secretly looking at?"

Na  oep  lax   zuuyunx.

He  like  eat  coconut

"他爱吃椰子，He likes to eat coconuts."

D.   Nouns as Adverbials 
When nouns act as adverbials to modify the head word, the head word must be a verb, and the adverbial nouns are placed before that head word, e.g.,

Neix  man cai   vuek

This  is       tree make

"这是木制的，This is made of wood."

Meuu  ashaux     hei  hyos?

You     tomorrow  go  question accent

"你明天去吗？Are you going tomorrow?"

E.   Pronouns as Adverbials 
When pronouns act as adverbials to modify the head word, the head word must be a verb, and the adverbial pronouns can either be placed before or after that head word, e.g.,

Na  dhongneix rien. = Na  rien  dhongneix.

He  like this       say = He  say   like this

"他这样说，He said (it) like this."

Gong  neix  dhongras  vuek = Gong  neix  vuek dhongras

work  this   how          do    = work   this  do    how

"这活儿怎样做？How (is) this work done?"

Qiras  dhaens = dhaens qiras

When arrive    = arrive    when

"何时到？When (will he) arrive?"

However, when pronouns act as adverbials to modify a head word that is an adjective, the adverbial pronouns are only placed after that head word, e.g.,

Gom     neix bheeng      dhonghauux.

"这地方那么宽，This region (is) so vast."

Zuu  zuen         aeu  neix  hleny         dhonghauux.

One  classififer  man this  good/kind  like that/so

"这个人那么好，This man (is) so good."

Zuu  dhanx       dhoei  neix daeus ras?

"这一条绳子有多长？How long (is) this rope?"

F.   Prepositional phrases as Adverbial 
When a prepositional phrase, using the prepositions "ia" (被, by) or "dheuu" (被, by), act as adverbials, the prepositional phrase only modifies a head word that is a verb, and must be placed before that head word, e.g.,

Ia   ba    gaenys

by  dog   bite

"被狗咬，bit by a dog"

dheuu  na  taeix

by        him hit

"被他打，hit by him"

When a prepositional phrase, using the prepositions "tuuen" (从, by), "dhuus" (在, in/at), "ku" (对, to), "uengx" (和, and),or "nyuek" (和, and) act as adverbials, the prepositional phrase only modifies the head word that is a verb, and must be placed either before or after that head word, e.g.,

tuuen  max zuu  dhanx      guen kaen    hwous

From   that   one classifier  road   go up mountain

"从这一条路上山，by that road (one can) go up the mountain"

toek  tuuen deuu  cai

"从树上掉下来，drop from the tree"

dhuus  blongs           dzoeng  meuu = dzoeng meuu  dhuus  blongs

at         house/home  wait      you    = wait        you    at         house/home

"在家等你，(I'll) wait for you at home."

ku  na   rien = rien  ku  na

to   him  say = say  to  him

"对他说，say to him"

uengx  meuu  hei= hei  uengx  meuu

With     you     go = go  with      you

"同你去，(I'll) go with you."

meuu  doengs  nyuek      na. = meuu  nyuek      na   doengs.

You     play        with/and  him = You   with/and  him  play

"你和他玩，You play with him."

Some prepositions, like "bhi" (比, than/compare), "dhuas" (过, than), "dhong" (同/像/如, same/be like), or "bhaen" (像, be like), have nouns as adverbials to modify the adjective head word, of which some are placed before that head word, others after, and still others either before or after, e.g.,

Before the adjective head word:

Meuu  bhi                   dhes  peek.

"你比我高，You (are) taller than me."

After the adjective head word:

Meuu  peek  dhuas na.

"你高过他，You (are) taller than him."

Dog  big    than    cat

"狗大过猫，A dog (is) bigger than a cat."

Before or after the adjective head word:

hloek  bhaen laengs

deep   like/as sea

"像海一样深，as deep as the sea."

enyx  dhong  guty

small like/as needle

"像针一样小，as small as a needle."

Kai          neix bhaen  eps    ghweis. = Kai         neix ghweis  bhaen  eps.

Chicken  this   like/as  duck fat         = Chicken this   fat        as        duck

"这只鸡像鸭一样肥，This chicken (is) as fat as (a) duck."

Sentence patterns and types

Sentence patterns and their basic rules

1.   Simple sentence 
The simple sentence includes subject-predicate sentence, no subject sentence, one word sentence, e.g.,

A.   Subject-predicate sentences 
Fas  fun  lo.

sky  rain  accent

"天要下雨了，It's going to rain."

Na  hei bhe.

He go  accent

"他去了，He went."

Enyxlauux  raeu   he.

Child             laugh  accent

"小孩笑了，(The) child(ren) laughed."

The simple sentences above include two elements: subjects and predicates, however, other elements like objects, complements, or adverbials can be included, e.g.,

(subject + predicate + object)

Hou  lax tax.

I        eat  rice

"我吃饭，I eat rice."

(subject + predicate + complement)

Na  qieus buuen  bhe.

He  bring   come  accent

"他拿来了，He brought (it with him)."

(subject + adverbial + predicate + complement)

Enyxlauux  bhaeis  fei     hluet  blongs.

Child          already  walk  into   house

"小孩走进屋子，(The) child(ren) walked into the house."

B.  No subject sentences 
This simple sentences look like inverted sentences, e.g.,

Tuut     dhoei   bhe.

Break   rope   accent

"断绳了，The rope (is) broken."

Hloei   aeu      dhat.

Many  people  really/very

"人真多，(There are) so many people."

Hlaeux  hlai bhe.

Die        fish accent

"鱼死了，The fish died."

C.  One word sentence 
Asras？

Who？

"谁？Who?"

Ahyo!

Oh my!

"哎哟！Oh my!"

A: "Meuu  kweis            da     kweis？"      B: "Kweis.'''"

     You     be willing to  NEG be willing to        be willing to

A: 'Are you willing (or) not willing?' B: '(Yes, I am) willing.'

A: 你愿意不愿意？B:愿意

 2.   Compound sentences 
There are two kinds of compound sentences; one is a coordinate compound sentence, the other is a subordinate compound sentence, e.g.,

 A.   Coordinate compound sentences 
The linked clauses in a coordinate compound sentence are equivalent. There are three kinds of relationships between linked clauses: parallel, progressive, and optional.

a.   The parallel relationship

Usually, there is no need of conjunctions between clauses.Hou  kweis hei  kuishuix,             na kweis  hei  ang.I        will      go  have a meeting  he  will     go   field

"我要去开会，他要去山栏地，I'm going to a meeting, he's going to the field."Coem  hweek  hou  ngan  lax dhuas,Fruit     banana  I      also   eat  auxiliary past tensezuuyunx  hou ngan  lax  dhuas.coconut   I       also  eat  auxiliary past tense

"香蕉我吃过，椰子我也吃过，I've eaten bananas, and I have also eaten coconuts."Na         hoen              vuek  veengs vuek  riens,He/she know how to  do     shirt      do     skirt

hoen              vuek  ang         vuek  dax.

know how to  do     hilly field  do    plain field

"她能做衣服做裙子，能耕田种地，She can make shirts and skirts, (she also) can work (in) hilly (and) plain fields."

b.   The progressive relationship

The conjunction words that express a progressive relationship between clauses are "loms" (又, still),"oms" (还, 却, yet),"ruus" (都, all), "koms" (连, even/also), and their similar phrases such as "dacaux…koms/uuloms…"(不但...而且...，not only... but also...), e.g.,Fas  bhaeis  cop,  na  loms  da  beuu.Sky  already  late  he   still    not come back

"天已经晚了，他还不回来，It was late, and he still (had) not come back."Fas  oms  da  dhenys,  na  bhaeis  hei  ang   he.Sky   yet    not  bright,   he  already  go field  accent

"天尚未亮，他已经去田里了，It was not yet the break of dawn, and he had already gone to the field."Meuuda  man Moei,  fa    man Hlai, gha  ruus  man uxaeu   Dongxgok.You          are    Han,  we  are    Li,    we   all      are    people China

"你们是汉族，我们是黎族，咱们都是中国人，You are Han, we are Li, we are all Chinese."Na  kueng             rien     tun                     Hlai,He  know how to  speak language/word  Likueng             rien     koms        tun                     Moei.know how to  speak  also/even language/word  Han

"他会说黎话，也会说汉话，He knows how to speak the Li language, also knows how to speak the Han language."hou  dacaux  dzueis  bhaeis,  uuloms   taeis  bhaeis.I       not only  read    finished,  but also  write finished

"我不仅看完了，而且写完了，Not only did I finish reading, but I also finished writing."

c.    The optional relationship

The conjunction words that express an optional relationship between clauses are "cuus"  (或, or), "cas"  (或, or), "casnus"  (或, or), "cuusnaus"  (或, or), and "dagoms" (或, or), e.g.,Pashlaus     meuu buuen, cas pasghueng          meuu  buuen.Old brother  your    come, or    younger brother  your   come

"你哥哥来，还是你弟弟来，(Either) your older brother (will) come, or your younger brother (will) come."Lax  man     cuusnaus  lax  tax？Eat   potato   or             eat  rice

"吃白薯还是米饭？Do you eat potatoes or rice?"Meuu  rien      ku  na,   dagoms  rien      ku  hou.You     say/tell  to him,  or            say/tell  to  me

"你对他说，或者告诉我，You tell him, or tell me."

 B.  Subordinate compound sentences 
The linked clauses in a coordinate compound sentence are not equivalent. There are three kinds of relationships between linked clauses: transitional, conditional, and causal.

a.   The transitional relationship

Usually, the first clause is the  subordinate clause, and the latter one is the major clause. The conjunction words that express a transitional relationship are "tom" (但是, but), "oms"  (却, but), and "dagoms"  (不然, otherwise), "tus" (但是, but), e.g.,Uupans     hou hei  zok  na,   tom  na hei  qix.Yesterday  I       go  to    him, but    he go   street

"昨天我到他家去，但是他已经上街去了，Yesterday I went to (find) him (at his house), but he had already hit the streets."Na   kweis vuek tun,      oms dhas zuugheidhang.She  want   sing a song, but    fear    shame

"她想唱歌，又怕害羞，She wants to sing, but fears embarrassment."Kweis  o      goms  o        dhat, dagoms'''    beuu       blongs.

Want   learn  then   learn  well,   otherwise go back  home

"要学就真正地学，不然就回家去，(If you) want to learn, then learn (it) well, otherwise, go back home."

b.   The conditional relationship

Usually, the first clause is the subordinate clause indicating the condition, and the latter one is the major clause expressing the consequence. The conjunction words that express a conditional relationship are "laeis" (如果, if), "dalunx" (无论, no matter what), e.g.,

Dalunx               na  rien dhongras, hou  ngan hei.

no matter what  he  say how,          I       also   go

"不管他怎样说，我都去，No matter what he says, I'll also go."

Laeis  na  da  buuen, dhes  fan   hei gongx  na.

If         he  not come,  I        then go  find      him

"如果他不来，我就去找他，If he doesn't come, then I'll go find him."

Laeis  zaux               tax,   hou  goms  lax.

If         have/there is  rice, I       then    eat

"如果有饭，我就吃，If there is rice, then I (will) eat."

Laeis  na   euu,   meuu  goms  waeix ku  hou  bas.

If         he  agree, you     then    tell      to  me   accent

"如果他答应，你就告诉我吧，If he agrees, then (you) tell me."

Sometimes, the conditional sentence does not need a conjunction word, e.g.,

Tuuen  kaux      vuek  gong,  nge   zaux  gan       zaux jien.

Out      strength  do    work,  must  have money  have  money

"努力工作，一定会有金钱，(If you) use strength to work, (you) will have money."

c.    The causal relationship

Usually, the first clause is the major clause indicating the result, and the latter one is the subordinate clause expressing the cause. The conjunction words that express a causal relationship are "hans" (因为, because), "dagoms" (不然, otherwise), e.g.,

Fas fun  yous  hei,dagoms    ia            cok.

Sky  rain don't  go  otherwise  gain/get  sickness

"天下雨了，别去，不然要得病，It's raining, don't go, otherwise (you'll) get sick."

Dhes  da hei,  hans        dhes cok  bhe.

I         not  go  because  I        sick accent

"我不去，因为我病了，I'm not going because I'm sick."

Hou beuu           bat   dhoei, hans       tuut   bhaeis.

I       come back  take rope, because  break  totally

"我回来拿绳子，因为全断了，I came back to take a rope, because (my rope is) totally broken."

Sometimes, the word "hans" also can be used in a conditional clause, e.g.,

Jieng,     hans                   hloei   ges            fa    ngan duuengx.

Success,  no matter what  much  price/cost  we also    give

"能成功的话，那么多少钱我们都给，(Achieve) success, no matter how much it costs."

When the loan words "ienxuis…dosdzis"are used to present the cause-result relationship, the causal clause is placed before the result clause, e.g.,

Ienxuis    boux neix  fas  raenx, dosdzis  daenslieng aiszangs  peek.

"因为今年天旱，所以产量不太高，Because this year it (is) dry, (so) the produce (is) not so much."

C.   Compressed compound sentences 
In view of idea expressed, the compressed sentence is a compound sentence; in view of construction, it is a simple sentence.

Dhes  ghais meuu  vuek  meshes goms  vuek  meshes.

I          tell     you     do     what       then   do     what

"我叫你做什么就做什么，Whatever I tell you to do, do (it)."

Hou kweis rien oms  dhas.

I        want   say  but   fear

"我想说又害怕，I want to speak but (I) fear (to say it)."

Na  faets    ngop  faets    hlenyvis.

He  more... think more... happy

"他越想越高兴，The more he thinks the more happy he is."

Bou  neix luuengx  bhoux  luuengx ghweis.

Pig   this   more...  feed     more...   fat

"这只猪越喂越肥，The more this pig is fed the fatter it is."

Na  lax       vuek  lax       dzuuns.

He  more... do    more... fast

"他越做越快，The more he works the faster he gets/becomes."

Aeu  ceeng  buuen  ceeng    hloei.

He    more... come   more... many

"人越来越多，The people coming (are) more and more."

Hlai Sentence Types and their basic rules
According to the function and mood, Hlai sentences can be classified as declarative sentences, interrogative sentences, imperative sentences, and exclamatory sentences.

1.   Declarative sentence

A.   Affirmative sentence
Hou  kweis  hei  ang.

I        will       go hilly field

"我要去山栏地，I will go to the hilly field."

Neix  man  veengs   na.

This   is      shirt/top her/his

"这是他/她的衣服，This is her/his shirt/top."

Sometimes, the linking verb is omitted, e.g.,

Neix  veengs     na.

This   shirt/top   her/his

"这是他/她的衣服，This (is) her/his shirt/top."

B.  Negative sentence 
Neix  ghwaix  veengs  na.

This   is not    shirt/top her/his

"这不是他/她的衣服，This is not her/his shirt."

Na  da  buuen  zo.

He  not  come  accent

"他还没来呢，He has not come yet."

2.   Interrogative sentence

A.   Using interrogative pronouns 
There are several interrogative pronouns that are used: "uuras/asras" (谁, who?), "meshes" (什么, what?), "dhongras" (怎样, how?), "ras" (哪，如何, where? which? how?), "qiras" (何时, when?), and "hloeiras" (多少, How much/many?), e.g.,

Neix  veengs    asras?

This   shirt/top  who?

"这是谁的衣服，Whose shirt is this?"

Uuras  uengx hou  hei?

Who    with     me  go?

"谁跟我去？Who(will) go with me?"

Neix  man  meshes?

This   is      what?

"这是什么？What is this?"

Vuek  dhongras naus  dhiu?

Do     how           just    right?

"怎么样做才好？How should it be done, so that it will be done right?"

Meuu  hei zok            ras?

You     go   to/toward where?

"你去哪儿？Where are you heading?"

Na qiras buuen?

He when come?

"他何时来？When (will) he come?"

zaux   hloeiras      zuen        uucok?

Have  how many  classifier sick

"有几个病号？How many (people) are sick?"

B.  Using interrogative accent words 
These questions require an answer: "Yes or no".

Ghwaix  na   bas?

Is not     him  accent

"不是他吧？It is not him, right?"

Neix  guu          meuu  hos?

This   belong to  you    accent

"这是你的吗？Does this belong to you?"

Meuu  bhaeis  lax  tax   hixhos?

You     already  eat rice  accent

"你已经吃过饭了吗？Did you already eat (rice)?"

(There are several more words used in the interrogative mood, so please see the section on accented words.)

C.  Using negation words ("da")

Meuu  kweis  hei  da?

You     will     go   NEG?

"你要去吗？Won't you go?"

Meuu  kweis            da?

You     be willing to  NEG?

"你愿意吗？Aren't you willing?"

Meuu  kweis  laeis  hisdhop  da?

You     want   see   movie    NEG?

"你要看电影吗？Don't you want to see a movie?"

Gong  neix hleny  da?

Stuff    this  good  NEG?

"这东西好吗？Isn't this stuff good?"

The conjunction word "cuus/cas" can be added before the negative words "da" to express a question, e.g.,

Meuu  qieng dheuu  cuus  da?

You     want    take    or      not?

"你想拿吗？Do you want to take (it) or not?"

Meuu  bhaeis  lax  cuus  da?

You     already  eat  or     not?

"你已经吃了吗？Have you already eaten or not?"

Veengs   neix hleny  cas  da?

shirt/top  this   good  or    not?

"这件衣服好吗？Is this shirt/top good or not?"

D.   Using conjunction words ("cuus/cas") 
The conjunction word "cuus/cas" can be added between two options to express a question, e.g.,

Meuu  dheuu cuus  ais?

You     want     or      don't want?

"你要不要？Do you want (it) or not?"

Fa   caem                   cuus  bhiek?

We  carry with hands  or      carry on shoulders?

"我们抬还是扛？Should we carry (it) with (our) hands or on (our) shoulders?"

Dhat                      cas  tuas?

Genuine/real/true  or    false/fake?

"真的还是假的？Are you telling the truth, or did you make it up?"

Another related conjunction word "cuusnaus/casnus" can be added between two options to express a question, e.g.,

Na  hei  cuusnaus hou  hei？

He  go   or              I       go?

"他去还是我去？Will he go or should I go?"

3.   Imperative sentence 
When a speaker demonstrates a request or a command, usually he will express it with an accent. When the subject is omitted, it can become a one word sentence, e.g.,

Buuen!

Come

"来！Come！"

Uuhaux     laus  zuucoeis     bas.

tomorrow pick  litchi (fruit)  accent

"明天摘荔枝吧！Tomorrow let's (finish) pick(ing) litchi (=a kind of fruit)!"

Uengxtoengs  dzuuns buuen  res!

Everyone        quickly  come   accent

"大家快来吧！Everyone, come quickly!"

(There are several more words used in the imperative mood, so please see the section on accented words.)

When a speaker expresses a prohibition, usually the adverbial word "yous" (别, don't) is used.

Yous   vuek!

Don't  do

"别做！Quit doing that!"

4.   Exclamatory sentence 
There are several words used in the exclamatory mood, like "ho", "a", "aei", "aidzo", "aiho", "euu", and "o". These words strongly express the speaker's feelings.

A.   An accented word in one word sentence 
Euu! Hauux bhe!

Yes! That is (it)!

"嗯！是！Yes! That's it!"

Aei!        Dhongras  vuek naus        hleny?

Oh my!  How           do    just/then  good

"哎哟！怎么做才好？Oh my! What's a good way to do this?"

B.  An accented word follows one word or one phrase 
Cok   ho!

Pain  accent

"疼啊！Ouch!"

Hleny      hloei  ho!

good/so  many  accent

"好多啊！So many!"

C.  An accented word at the end of a sentence 
Aidzo!   Keuuhwoek ho!

Oh my!  Poor            accent

"哎哟！可惜啊！Oh (my)! Poor (guy)!"

Tau  bhaeis  poens  a!

Pot  already  break  accent

"锅已经破了！The pot broke!"

Bheuucai   neix hleny  lax  ho!

Vegetable  this   good eat  accent

"这菜好吃啊！This vegetable (=dish) (is) good to eat (=delicious)!"

Noms  neix ghan  a!

Water  this   cold  accent

"这水凉啊！This water is cold!"

(There are several more words used in the exclamatory mood, so please see the section on accented words.)

Influence of Chinese grammar
Due to the frequent contacts made between the Li (黎族) and the Han (汉族) over a relatively lengthy stretch of time, the Hlai language has been influenced by the Chinese language and its grammar. As previously mentioned, the Hlai counting system for dates, ordinal numbers, and measurements have been influenced by Chinese. In this chapter, the Chinese influence in Hlai's word order of attribute phrases, verb-object-complement phrases, and interrogative sentences is discussed.

Attribute phrases 
Nouns act as head words, and the attribute word is a number. Natively, the number should be placed before the head word. But, due to the Chinese influence, the number can be placed after the head word, e.g.,

When nouns act as head words, and the attribute words are demonstrative pronouns and numbers, the number is placed before the head word and the demonstrative pronoun after the head word. But, due to Chinese influence, the word order has become more like the word order in Chinese, e.g.,

When two nouns are placed together as an attribute phrase, the front noun is the head word, and the back one the attribute word. However, due to Chinese influence, the word order can be changed, but only when applied to loan word attribute phrases, e.g.,

Another kind of attribute phrase is where the noun is the head word and the adjective is the attribute word. When the words in the phrase are all loan words, the word order follows the Chinese one, e.g.,

However, when the words in the phrase are not all loanwords, the adjective is placed after the noun, e.g.,

Verb-object-complement phrases 
When verbs act as head words, the word order is verb-object-complement. But, due to Chinese influence, the word order, verb-complement-object has also been adopted, e.g.,

Interrogative sentences 
The native ways to denote a question in the Hlai language are using interrogative pronouns, interrogative accents, or placing the negation word  at the end of a sentence. However, due to Chinese influence, a new word order has appeared, which is, verb (head word) + negation + verb, e.g.,

The possessive auxiliary word  

References

Bibliography 

Kra–Dai grammars
Kra–Dai languages